= Ann Spencer (artist) =

American modern artist

Ann Spencer Simon
- Born: Ann Spencer; June 13, 1918
- Died: December 10, 1999 (aged 81)
- Education: Art Students League of New York, San Francisco, Pennsylvania Fine Arts Academy
- Known for: Art; Printmaker, illustrator, watercolorist
- Movement: landscape, regionalism, cowboy

Ann Simon Harrison Spencer (June 13, 1918 – December 10, 1999) was an American modern artist. Born the daughter of American impressionist painter Robert Spencer and American architect and painter Margaret Fulton Spencer on June 13, 1918, Spencer grew up in New Hope, Pennsylvania and New York City spending a majority of her adult career in Tucson, Arizona where she was an important figure in the Modern Art movement. She regularly exhibited her drawings and paintings in New York and Arizona, was a published illustrator and produced caricatures that appeared in newsprint.

== Early life and art ==
Growing up in an artistic milieu, Spencer attended Holmquist between 1930 and 1931; and was a student at the College Science in Paris during the years 1934–193. In 1935 and 1936 she studied at the Art Students League of New York studying under with Harry Sternberg. In January 1937 her work was exhibited at the League gallery.

In the mid-1930s, after the death of her father, her mother purchased a large property west of Tucson, Arizona to design and build Rancho de Las Lomas, a noted guest ranch on the edge of Tucson Mountain Park. Ann Spencer began spending winters in Tucson and quickly assimilated into the arts community.

Her early work, primarily drawings, were satirical caricatures influenced by French artist Jean Ignace Isidore Gérard Grandville. Spencer spent the winter of 1938 in New York. In January 1939 she showed etchings, lithographs, caricatures and illustrations at the Ferargil Galleries in New York.

== Tucson Arizona and Artistic Development ==
In September the Spencers returned from their home in New Hope, Pennsylvania to Tucson for the winter. In the spring of 1940, Spencer illustrated a book by author Reg Regan and her caricatures began to appear in the Arizona Daily Star.

In October 1940 she participate in the Tucson Fine Arts Association Open Show presenting her work "Pure American". By 1945 her illustrations were garnering broad attention and were published in the May issue of Asia Magazine. Spencer was member of the New York Brush and Pen Club and given a solo show during this period. She wrote and illustrated the book "Dudes and Dopes." Her illustrations were presented at the Philadelphia Print Club exhibitions and in several newspapers and private collections.

Spencer was a feature writer for the Warner Robins Air Command at Warner Georgia and the Macon Georgia Paper and was a staff writer on Current Biographies magazine in New York in 1945. In 1946 Spencer had her first formal one-man show at the Associated American Artists Galleries, on Fifth Avenue, New York. By October 1953 she joined the important early modern 261 Gallery Group in Tucson and was exhibiting at the Temple of Music and Art in Tucson a whimsical work titled "Eclopasm."

In the late 1940s and 1950s her work began to shift from classic caricatures to modern surrealism which used color, detailed illustration and satirical metaphorical approaches to offer fresh commentary on social mores. In 1955 her paintings and drawings were exhibited at the Rosequist Gallery at 18 South Congress Street in Tucson, the local paper noted Spencer "is known for the sharp satirical humor and special consciousness of her work." The gallery would regularly present her work in the coming decades.

She exhibited work in the 10th Annual Independent Open Show at the Art Center of the Tucson Fine Arts Association in 1956. In May 1960 she again showed at the Rosequist Gallery as part of a Group Contemporary art exhibition. Her oil painting "Premium Stamps" was featured in the Tucson Citizen as part of the showing.

In May 1961 she again exhibited tempera paintings at Rosequist with Charles Littler and Paul Dyck. Three of her paintings exhibited in the show were featured in the Tucson Citizen Newspaper and one in the Arizona Daily Star. Tucson Art critic, Beitirce Edgerly wrote, "Her oil paintings and lithograph drawings were achieved with skillful craftsmanship and with unique and lovely qualities of color and design. The grotesque figures - birds and beasts and fishes - that inhabit these works are faultlessly constructed in every detail. Possibly the greatest charm lies in the individual conception of each piece, envisioned with delicate and subtle humor, verging on caricatures but never gross nor vindictive. Some of these are poetic fantasies suggesting Lewis Carroll and Gelett Burgess; some other venture forms of surrealism."

She was included in a 1962 exhibition at the Rosequist Gallery in Taos. Spencer's work was presented alongside Ross Stefan, and Gerry Peirce. In January 1965 Spencer exhibited at the Cosmos Gallery in the mezzanine of the Santa Rita Hotel with her parents Robert and Margaret. in a full-page review of the exhibition the paper noted, "Ann, has one of the most interesting talents being exhibited today, unique in a satiric approach that is highly imaginative in the concept, skilled and subtle in technique. The whimsical and often cutting sense of humor that dominates her tempera paintings and black and white drawings is something that all art lovers should see."

In November she presented another collection of new works at the Cosmos Art Gallery. Casein Paintings on gesso inspired by T.S. Eliot's "Old Possum's book of Practical Cats"

In 1968 she joined with artists including Bruce MeGrew, Mark Voris, Charles Littler, Gerry Peirce and Andrew Rush to present an art fair to raise funds for a Martin Luther King Jr. Memorial Scholarship Fund. She worked with the NAACP and the Urban League using her art to raise funds. In March 1971 she exhibited "Art Satirical" at the Tucson Art Center.

Spencer died in Tucson on December 10, 1999.

== Legacy ==
Spencer was included in the 1998 University of Arizona Museum of Art Show: "Early Tucson Moderns' ' which provided the first critical evaluation and retrospective of Tucson's modern artistic development. Spencer was listed as a notable artist by Marquis Who's Who and was a member of the National Association for the Advancement of Colored People, Tucson Art Center, Pacific Grove Art Center, Art Students League.

Spencer's works are both whimsical and modern, embracing contemporary ideas she accumulated during her studies and travels.
