= Mac Schweitzer =

American artist (1921–1962)

- Born: Mary Alice Cox; July 8, 1921; Cleveland, Ohio, U.S.
- Died: June 27, 1962 (aged 40); Navajo National Monument, Tonalea, Arizona
- Spouses: John L. "Jack" Schweitzer (m. 1943; div. 1952) Arthur H. White (m. 1958)
- Children: Kit Schweitzer b. 1944; Thomas White b. 1959
- Website: macschweitzer.com

Mary Alice Cox "Mac" Schweitzer (1921–1962) was an American artist whose distinct abstract desert style contributed to the development of the "modern" period of art in Tucson, Arizona, and the American Southwest. She received critical acclaim during her short life and after her death. Her artistic style was born out of her love of cowboy rodeo culture and blended with abstract figurative representation.

== Life and work ==
Born in Cleveland, Ohio, Schweitzer taught herself to draw horses by attending the rodeo and talking with cowboys about her sketches. It was in the rodeo arena she met Tucson cowboy artist Pete Martinez and watched him draw. Schweitzer would later reflect on this period, “I felt in my bones the West was my country [...] When I saw my first rodeo, I knew I'd never by happy until I came out here.”

During high school she wrote to western artist Will James, enclosing a drawing of a bucking bronco. He wrote back encouraging her to continue the development of her art. Schweitzer earned a scholarship and studied at the Cleveland School of Art. She met and married artist John Schweitzer who left art school to serve in the U.S. army during WWII.

Schweitzer exhibited in the eastern United States at the Cleveland Museum of Art, as part of the Ohio Valley Water Color Show, and at the Butler Institute of American Art. The couple had a joint exhibition in Potsdam, New York, while John was serving in the Army. In 1945 she had her first son Kit Schweitzer.

== Life in Tucson ==
Drawn to the desert Schweitzer arrived in Tucson Arizona to paint in 1947. Schweitzer quickly acclimated to the cultural environment of the Sonoran Desert city, and in March 1947, Schweitzer exhibited her first solo exhibition in Tucson at the Arizona Inn. The show featured oil paintings, watercolors, and pen and ink drawings. By April she was showing work at the Kay and Elaine Gift Shop at 52 West Alameda Street in Tucson.

Schweitzer authored and illustrated children's books including Blue Ribbons for Meg published by Little, Brown and Company which received national recognition including being named book of the month by the Junior Literary Guild.

In July 1947 she was included in the Southern Arizona Bank and Trust Gallery exhibit alongside noted Tucson artists Hutton Webster Jr., Charles Bolsius, and Ray Strange.

Schweitzer said, “I paint pictures for the same reason a composer sets down a melody or an author writes a book - to capture the thoughts running around in my head and crystalize them in paint on canvas. That is the only way I can express myself to my own satisfaction.”

Schweitzer participated in the important 1948 Tucson Independent Artist’ Group exhibition New Look at Art with a work titled Catalina Torrent that was noted in the local paper. Her work in the exhibit received formal honorable mention and the first popular choice award. She received numerous Arizona State Fair arts awards as well as the Oklahoma Museum purchase prize. Her work was presented in the second solo exhibition at the experimental 261 Gallery.

In 1949 and again in the early '50s she tried her hand at rodeo riding, placing several times. She and her husband Jack went separate ways in 1950 and divorced in 1952. Mac stayed in Tucson with her son Kit.

== Northern Arizona and death ==
Schweitzer began spending time in Northern Arizona on the Navajo Reservation finding inspiration. She said of this period, “Looking and seeing is the most important part of my trade, [...] I have learned to look past the obvious and see the subtle colors, interesting shapes, patterns, and textures. She continued, The comes the challenge. Can my hand cooperate with my brain? Sometimes the painting comes up to or even exceeds the mental picture. Quite often it does not.”

In 1958 Schweitzer married Arthur H. White, the superintendent of the Navajo National Monument, and moved from Tucson to Northern Arizona. In 1959, Thomas White, her second son was born. Her work was gaining national attention. In February 1960 she showed at the Galerie Gildea in San Francisco and in April at the opening exhibit of Raymond Burr’s Swarthe-Burr gallery in Los Angeles.

Citizen Magazine Editor, Micheline Keating, remembering Schweitzer wrote, On the rare occasions when she came to Tucson, she seemed more restless than ever before. Her paintings became fewer. But what she did do was her finest work. ‘This is what we have been waiting for,’ her friends and the collectors and the critics said.

In February 1962 she showed as part of the third annual Tubac Arts and Crafts Festival.

In March 1962 she held her last show at the Rosequist Galleries in Tucson. Her oil painting Hunter and Prey was published with a review from Beatrice Edgerly, an art critic for the Arizona Daily Star, For some years familiar to Tucson art lovers, the paintings and drawings by Mac Schweitzer have been characterized by increasingly marked development of individual and experimental qualities. Even the works of infinitely more mature artists show certain inconsistencies of efforts. Throughout her process, Mac Schweitzer has produced some work of exceptional merits [...] she has consistently revealed a unique personal approach and a certain technical virtuosity in many painting there is fine sense of original and creative expression.

Her painting of a pueblo, owned by designer Robert Kuykendall, was featured by Mary Brown in the 1962 Tucson Citizen Homes Section.

On June 27, 1962, at nearly 41, Schweitzer's body was found in her car on a dirt road near her home at Navajo National Monument, a remote area on the Navaho Indian Reservation. Although the coroner's report and newspapers stated that the cause of death was suicide, a follow-up investigation was not pursued.

== Legacy ==
During her life, Schweitzer's art was acquired by collectors and museums and after her death, her work continued to be exhibited to a limited degree yet remained coveted by a few collectors. The Rosequest Gallery continued to represent her work briefly; in December 1962, they exhibited her paintings alongside Maynard Dixon and Ray Strange. In February 1964 the Tucson Art Center held a two-week Mac Schweitzer Retrospective curated by Jack Maul, Harrison Moore, and Mrs. Maurice Grossman. A personal essay by Citizen Magazine Editor Micheline Keating was published as the Citizen Magazine cover story on March 7, 1964, in conjunction with the exhibition.

"Throughout her life, there was in Mac a great unrest that she was unable to break or train. And in time, it became stronger than she was." She concluded, “For as long as there are paintings like these and walls to hang them on, something of Mac Schweitzer will live on for all of us.”

Schweitzer was included in the critical 1998 University of Arizona Museum of Art Show: Early Tucson Moderns.
