= Rosequist Gallery =

Art Gallery located in Tucson, Arizona

The Rosequist Gallery, also known as the Rosequist Galleries, was a significant American art gallery located in Tucson, Arizona that represented and sold Western, contemporary and international art. Originally established as a custom frame shop by Jane and Ivan Rosequist in 1946, the gallery grew over the next twenty years into one of the most important in Arizona and the American West. The Rosequits cultivated and supported emerging artist, represented major American painters and were a touchstone for collectors and institutions. The Rosequists sold the gallery 1968 but it continued under the same name through 2006.

== Background and early years ==
Ivan Rosequist was born of Swedish descent in Pennsylvania in 1906. He grew up Jamestown, New York, attended Columbia University, and served two years in the U.S. Army. He chased business and worked for Sherman-Williams Paint Co. In the middle of the depression he pursued acting in Hollywood and New York. During this period he met and married Jane Alling before returning to Cleveland in 1934 where he was active in the Federal Theatre Project and the Cleveland Play House. During WWII the couple worked in a factory, Jane working as a machine operator before a desk job and then clerical work.

Jane's sister Priscilla was married to noted artist Gerry Peirce and encouraged the couple to move to Tucson, Arizona. They arrived in 1945 and seeing that Tucson needed a frame shop established a business.

The Rosequists opened a picture framing studio “Rosequist Frame Shop” at 18 South Convent Street in September 1946. Although in later newspaper sources, the open date was noted as 1945. Jane Rosequist reminiscing on the opening said, “There were dirt floors and an outside privy then” The small firm created and manufactured original molding and frames.

By Summer 1951 the frame shop began selling fine prints, created by artists including, Utrillo, Cézanne, and Picasso. The store was renamed “Ivan Rosequist Fine Prints and Skilled Framing.” In November the store presented its first print exhibition “Bird Show” featuring Audubon Prints and work by Martinet, Fawcett, and Catesby. The store continued to grow from a “tiny shop” into a business that included a print room and gallery for originals, a lumber mill for original Rosequist frame molding, and a print shop.

In February 1953 the gallery presented “Old and New Prints,” which included a Maynard Dixon oil painting, work by Winslow Homer, and prints by Moreau.

== Establishment of gallery ==
By November the gallery acquired two large N.C. Wyeth originals which became the base for an exhibit of the best of western art and sculpture from the “old west” which was shown both in Phoenix and Tucson. The exhibition included six Wyeth paintings, a Karl Gillissen oil, two paintings by Charles Lanman, a pair of bronzes and drawings by Frederic Remington, a large Thomas Moran oil on panel, and a large oil on canvas titled “Watchers from the Housetops by Maynard Dixon. The exhibition received national attention and multiple paintings in the exhibit were parched by Lewis W. Douglas for the Southern Arizona Bank and Trust Collection.

Jane Rosequist discussing the development of the gallery in 1968 noted, “Along with framing we acquired a few prints for sale, then we rented two more shops in the building, opened them into each other and made a real gallery [...] We had a slow, gradual growth. After prints, some western Americana was added, sculpture and on to contemporary paintings representing the work of artists through this country and abroad. Our first big sale was [...] when Lewis Douglas brought a group of N.C. Wyeth paintings.

In September 1954, the Rosequist expanded the shop with additional gallery space and by November the shop had been rebranded as “The Ivan Rosequist Galleries.”

The gallery continued to expand until it took occupied almost an entire city block. They represented and promoted Paul Dyck in America, Ross Stefan, sculptor Ruth Pierce and Robert Hartman. Their shows featured works by French artists Philippe Auge and Pierre Sicard, Germany's Max Gunther, Mexico's Francisco Zúñiga, and China's Chen Chi.

Ivan moved to Taos, New Mexico to open a new gallery. Rosequist and actor Raymond Burr secured a lease on the site of the Our Lady of Guadalupe Church that had burned down. They abandoned plans to build and art center but instead opened the gallery in the old Joseph Sharp House on Kit Carson Road called Mission Gallery. Jane remained in Tucson overseeing operations. In 1964 the Rosequis were divorced.

Ivan remarried Rena Oppenheimer. and the couple ran the Mission Gallery, which by 2012 was one of the oldest galleries in Taos.

== Sale and legacy ==
In 1968, Jane Rosequist sold the Rosequist Galleries to Ralph J. Wollheim, a Chicago antique dealer. The name was retained and Rosequist remind the gallery manager for a year.

In August 1969 Jane retired from the gallery stating at the time, “I shall do something, I am too used to working to just stagnate. Perhaps the time has come for me to complete the full cycle and finally start caring a torch for the underdog.”

Ivan Rosequist died in Taos, New Mexico on February 12, 1985.

The Rosequist Gallery continued operation through 2006.
