= National Register of Historic Places listings in Graham County, Arizona =

Location of Graham County in Arizona

This is a list of the National Register of Historic Places listings in Graham County, Arizona. It is intended to be a complete list of the properties and districts on the National Register of Historic Places in Graham County, Arizona, United States. The locations of National Register properties and districts for which the latitude and longitude coordinates are included below, may be seen in a map.

There are 34 properties and districts listed on the National Register in the county, including 2 that are also National Historic Landmarks.

This National Park Service list is complete through NPS recent listings posted May 1, 2026.

== Current listings ==
	Name on the Register	Image	Date listed	Location	City or town	Description
1	Arizona Bank and Trust	Arizona Bank and Trust	February 9, 1988 (#87002557)	429 Main; 32°49′59″N 109°42′42″W	Safford	
2	Richard Bingham House	Richard Bingham House	February 9, 1988 (#87002556)	1208 9th Ave. 32°49′34″N 109°43′05″W	Safford	
3	Bonita Store	Bonita Store	March 6, 1998 (#98000172)	1 mile northwest of the junction of State Route 266 and Arizona Industrial School Rd. 32°35′22″N 109°58′08″W	Bonita	
4	Paul Brooks House	Paul Brooks House	February 9, 1988 (#87002559)	1033 5th Ave. 32°49′40″N 109°42′44″W	Safford	
5	Buena Vista Hotel	Buena Vista Hotel	February 9, 1988 (#87002560)	322 Main; 32°50′00″N 109°42′38″W	Safford	No longer extant
6	Columbine Work Station	Columbine Work Station	June 10, 1993 (#93000516)	State Route 366 southwest of Safford in the Coronado National Forest; 32°42′13″N 109°54′46″W	Safford	
7	T. D. Cross House	T. D. Cross House	February 9, 1988 (#87002563)	908 1st Ave. 32°49′47″N 109°42′28″W	Safford	
8	William Charles Davis House	William Charles Davis House	February 9, 1988 (#87002565)	301 11th St. 32°49′38″N 109°42′37″W	Safford	
9	Graham County Courthouse	Graham County Courthouse	May 25, 1982 (#82002077)	800 Main St. 32°49′59″N 109°42′57″W	Safford	
10	Heliograph Lookout Complex	Heliograph Lookout Complex	January 28, 1988 (#87002467)	Coronado National Forest; 32°39′00″N 109°50′56″W	Old Columbine	
11	Joe Horowitz House	Joe Horowitz House	February 9, 1988 (#87002566)	118 Main; 32°50′01″N 109°42′31″W	Safford	
12	House at 611 Third Avenue	House at 611 Third Avenue	February 9, 1988 (#87002568)	611 3rd Ave. 32°49′58″N 109°42′35″W	Safford	
13	Kearny Campsite and Trail	Kearny Campsite and Trail	October 9, 1974 (#74000454)	Northeast of Safford off U.S. Route 666; 32°53′38″N 109°28′44″W	Safford	
14	Marijilda Canyon Prehistoric Archeological District		October 2, 1988 (#88001572)	Address Restricted	Safford	
15	Mathew O'Brien House	Mathew O'Brien House	February 9, 1988 (#87002570)	615 1st Ave. 32°49′57″N 109°42′26″W	Safford	
16	Oak Draw Archeological District		November 25, 1992 (#92001564)	Address Restricted	Safford	
17	Oddfellows Home	Oddfellows Home	May 12, 1988 (#87002571)	808 8th Ave. 32°49′49″N 109°43′01″W	Safford	
18	George A. Olney House	George A. Olney House	February 9, 1988 (#87002574)	1104 Central; 32°49′39″N 109°42′42″W	Safford	
19	Alonzo Hamilton Packer House	Alonzo Hamilton Packer House	February 9, 1988 (#87002575)	1203 Central; 32°49′34″N 109°42′39″W	Safford	
20	Point of Pines	Point of Pines	October 15, 1966 (#66000182)	Address Restricted	Morenci	
21	Power's Cabin	Power's Cabin	August 13, 1975 (#75000348)	Northwest of Willcox in the Coronado National Forest; 32°35′38″N 110°20′43″W	Willcox	Location of the 1918 Power's Cabin Shootout
22	David Ridgeway House	David Ridgeway House	February 9, 1988 (#87002576)	928 Central; 32°49′46″N 109°42′42″W	Safford	
23	Safford High School	Safford High School	February 9, 1988 (#87002577)	520 11th St. 32°49′41″N 109°42′47″W	Safford	School building built in 1915, listed on the National Register in 1988, and apparently razed in mid-1990s but still not yet delisted.
24	Sierra Bonita Ranch	Sierra Bonita Ranch	October 15, 1966 (#66000181)	Southwest of Bonita; 32°30′36″N 110°02′15″W	Bonita	Extends into Cochise County
25	Southern Pacific Railroad Depot	Southern Pacific Railroad Depot	February 9, 1988 (#87002578)	808 Central; 32°49′52″N 109°42′42″W	Safford	
26	Hugh Talley House	Hugh Talley House	February 9, 1988 (#87002580)	1114 3rd Ave. 32°49′37″N 109°42′37″W	Safford	
27	William Talley House	William Talley House	February 9, 1988 (#87002581)	219 11th St. 32°49′38″N 109°42′35″W	Safford	
28	Webb Peak Lookout Tower		January 28, 1988 (#87002464)	Off State Route 366; 32°42′41″N 109°55′19″W	Old Columbine	
29	James R. Welker House	James R. Welker House	February 9, 1988 (#87002582)	1127 Central; 32°49′36″N 109°42′40″W	Safford	House built in 1915 with elements of Queen Anne style
30	West Peak Lookout Tower		January 28, 1988 (#87002466)	Coronado National Forest; 32°44′15″N 110°02′15″W	Bonita	
31	David Wickersham House	David Wickersham House	February 9, 1988 (#87002583)	1101 5th Ave. 32°49′38″N 109°42′43″W	Safford	
32	Dan Williams House	Dan Williams House	February 9, 1988 (#87002584)	603 Relation; 32°49′26″N 109°42′51″W	Safford	
33	J. Mark Wilson House	J. Mark Wilson House	February 9, 1988 (#87002585)	712 Relation; 32°49′28″N 109°42′57″W	Safford	
34	Woman's Club	Woman's Club	May 12, 1988 (#87002586)	215 Main; 32°49′59″N 109°42′35″W	Safford	Woman's Club building designed by M.H. Starkweather and built in 1930.

== See also ==
- List of National Historic Landmarks in Arizona
- National Register of Historic Places listings in Arizona
