= Tubac, Arizona =

Community in Santa Cruz County, Arizona

- Census-designated place
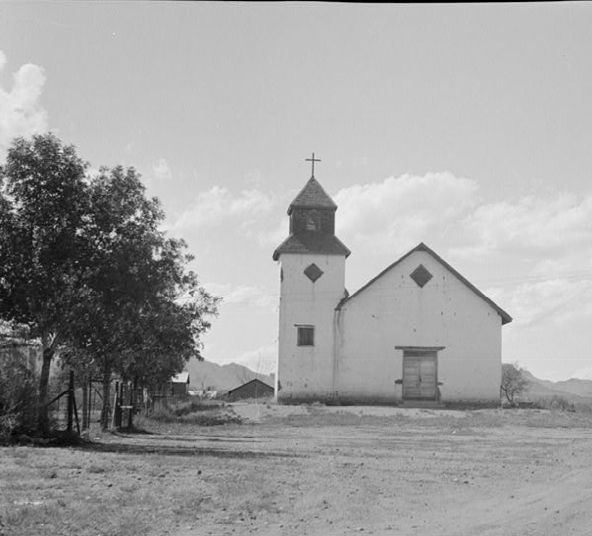
- St. Ann's Church, Tubac, 1937

- Location in Santa Cruz County and the state of Arizona

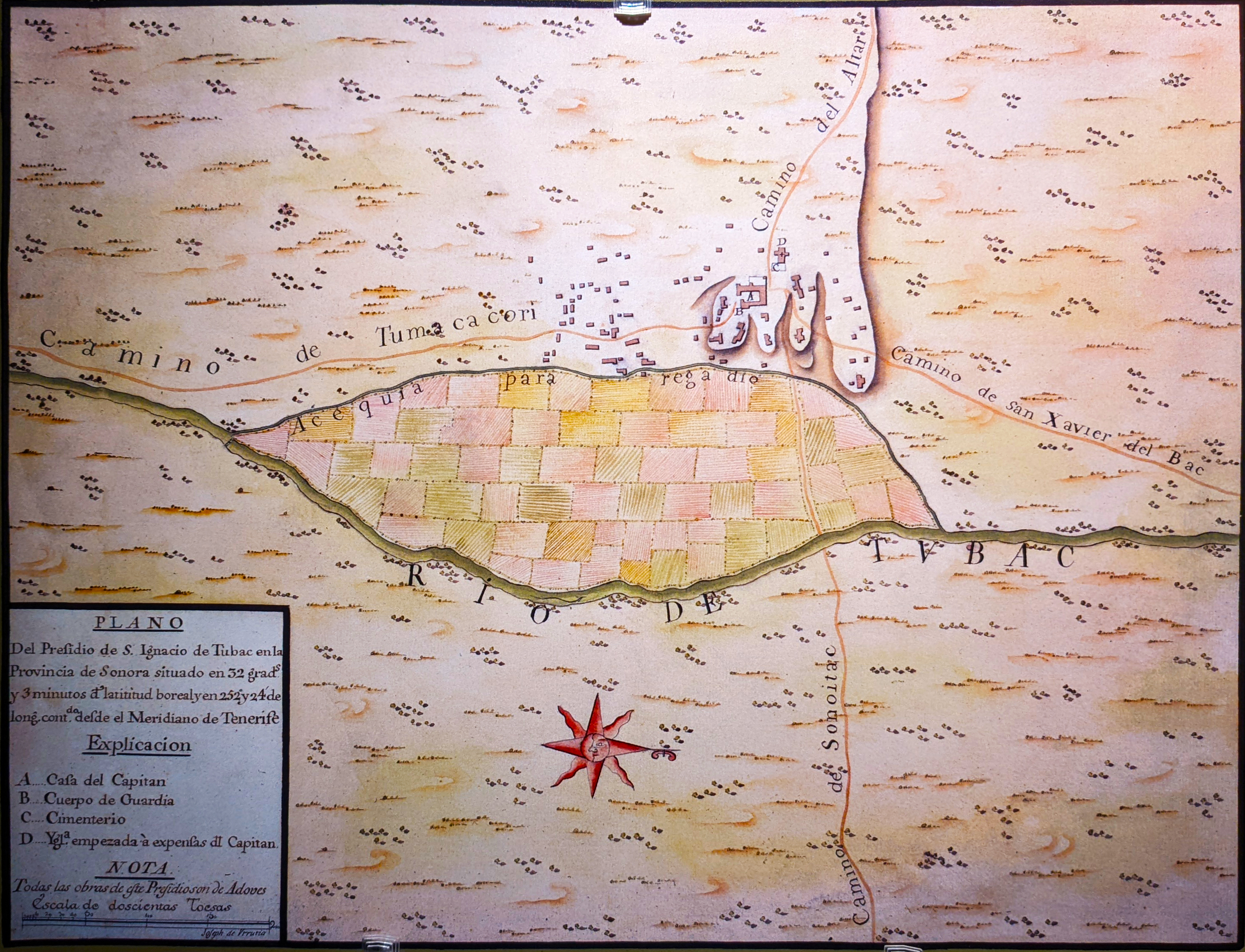
- 18th century map of Tubac and surroundings

- Location in Arizona Location in the United States
- Coordinates: 31°37′32″N 111°3′7″W
- Country: United States
- State: Arizona
- County: Santa Cruz

Area
  - Total: 10.85 sq mi (28.10 km^{2})
  - Land: 10.85 sq mi (28.09 km^{2})
  - Water: 0.0039 sq mi (0.01 km^{2})
- Elevation: 3,209 ft (978 m)

Population (2020)
  - Total: 1,581
  - Density: 145.8/sq mi (56.28/km^{2})
- Time zone: UTC-7 (MST (no DST))
- ZIP codes: 85640, 85646
- Area code: 520
- FIPS code: 04-75940
- GNIS feature ID: 0035489

Tubac is a census-designated place (CDP) in Santa Cruz County, Arizona, United States. The population was 1,191 at the 2010 census. The place name "Tubac" is an English borrowing from a Hispanicized form of the O'odham name Cuwak, which translates into English as "place of dark water". When first taken into Spanish speech, it was spelled Tubaca. Finally, over time, the latter "a" was dropped. Tubac is situated on the Santa Cruz River.

Tubac was the original Spanish colonial garrison in Arizona. It was depopulated during the O'odham Uprising in the 18th century. During the 19th century, the area was repopulated by miners, farmers and ranchers, but the town of Tubac is best known today as an artists' colony.

== History ==
Established in 1752 as a Spanish presidio, the first Spanish colonial garrison in what is now Arizona, Tubac was one of the stops on the Camino Real (the "Royal Road") from Mexico to the Spanish settlements in California.

Tubac's most famous Spanish resident was Juan Bautista de Anza. While stationed at Tubac (1760–1776), de Anza built the chapel of Santa Gertrudis, the foundations of which lie beneath today's St. Ann's Church.

Apaches attacked the town repeatedly in the 1840s, forcing the Sonoran Mexicans to abandon both Tumacacori and Tubac.

Tubac was the scene of a four-day siege in 1861 among the population of Tubac, Confederate militia, and Apache warriors.

The Confederates won and the Confederate flag used by the headquarters in Richmond was raised. When Union troops then started to approach Tucson, the Confederate troops left Tubac. There the town lay abandoned; grass grew in the streets and the adobe houses crumbled away.

From the 1930s–1960s, Tubac evolved into an art colony. Painter Dale Nichols opened an art school in the small desert village in 1948 and restored some of Tubac's historic buildings. Students included watercolorist Al Romo and sculptor Bob Brisley. In 1955, artist Ross Stefan established a studio in the village. In 1961, the Santa Cruz Valley Art Association was formed with 80 members. This group founded the Tubac Festival of the Arts in 1964. Other significant artists in the Village included Sophie and Harwood Steiger, Hal Empie and Hugh Cabot.

== Geography ==
Tubac is located at 31°37′32″N 111°3′7″W (31.625462, -111.051921).

According to the United States Census Bureau, the CDP has a total area of 10.8 square miles (28.0 km^{2}), all land.

== Demographics ==
Historical population
Census	Pop.	Note	%±
2000	949		—
2010	1,191		25.5%
2020	1,581		32.7%
U.S. Decennial Census

=== 2020 census ===
As of the 2020 census, Tubac had a population of 1,581. The median age was 68.7 years. 4.1% of residents were under the age of 18 and 60.5% of residents were 65 years of age or older. For every 100 females there were 90.9 males, and for every 100 females age 18 and over there were 89.0 males age 18 and over.

0.0% of residents lived in urban areas, while 100.0% lived in rural areas.

There were 828 households in Tubac, of which 8.5% had children under the age of 18 living in them. Of all households, 57.7% were married-couple households, 12.3% were households with a male householder and no spouse or partner present, and 23.3% were households with a female householder and no spouse or partner present. About 28.5% of all households were made up of individuals and 18.5% had someone living alone who was 65 years of age or older.

There were 1,129 housing units, of which 26.7% were vacant. The homeowner vacancy rate was 4.9% and the rental vacancy rate was 18.5%.

Racial composition as of the 2020 census
Race	Number	Percent
White	1,320	83.5%
Black or African American	13	0.8%
American Indian and Alaska Native	14	0.9%
Asian	6	0.4%
Native Hawaiian and Other Pacific Islander	2	0.1%
Some other race	57	3.6%
Two or more races	169	10.7%
Hispanic or Latino (of any race)	245	15.5%

=== 2010 census ===
As of the census of 2010, there were 1,191 people residing in Tubac. The racial makeup of Tubac was 76.7% non-Hispanic White, 0.6% Native American, 0.4% Black or African American, 0.59% Asian, 6.5% from other races, and 1.1% from two or more races. 20.7% of the population were Hispanic or Latino of any race.

In Tubac 1.5% of the population was age 0–4, 4.7% from 5 to 17, 51.0% from 18 to 64, and 42.5% 65 years of age or older. The population of Tubac is 52.4% female and 47.6% male.

=== 2000 census ===
As of the census of 2000, there were 949 people, 481 households, and 303 families residing in the CDP. The population density was 115.9 inhabitants per square mile (44.7/km^{2}). There were 569 housing units at an average density of 69.5 per square mile (26.8/km^{2}). The racial makeup of the CDP was 88.7% White, 1.2% Native American, 0.4% Asian, 9.0% from other races, and 0.7% from two or more races. 18.2% of the population were Hispanic or Latino of any race.

There were 481 households, out of which 12.5% had children under the age of 18 living with them, 59.3% were married couples living together, 2.9% had a female householder with no husband present, and 36.8% were non-families. 32.6% of all households were made up of individuals, and 21.0% had someone living alone who was 65 years of age or older. The average household size was 1.97 and the average family size was 2.45.

In the CDP, the population was spread out, with 12.3% under the age of 18, 2.5% from 18 to 24, 12.1% from 25 to 44, 37.8% from 45 to 64, and 35.2% who were 65 years of age or older. The median age was 58 years. For every 100 females, there were 92.5 males. For every 100 females age 18 and over, there were 89.5 males.

The median income for a household in the CDP was $39,444, and the median income for a family was $59,375. Males had a median income of $36,528 versus $30,268 for females. The per capita income for the CDP was $46,643. About 2.1% of families and 6.6% of the population were below the poverty line, including none of those under age 18 and 7.9% of those age 65 or over.

== Arts and culture ==
The remains of the old Spanish presidio are preserved by Tubac Presidio State Historic Park. The park also features a regional museum, an underground archeology display, and other historic buildings. Modern Tubac is home to over 100 art galleries, home decor boutiques, gift shops, jewelers, potters, and artists of every kind. There is a very active art school, along with several restaurants and a golf resort nestled along a verdant valley with one of the oldest stands of cottonwoods in the state.

== Notable people ==
Congressman Will Rogers, Jr. retired to a ranch near Tubac and is buried at the Tubac Cemetery.
