= Alfred Rudolph =

French-born American artist (1881–1942)

- Born: Alfred Rudolph Otto Johannes Bruenauer-Lippert; September 21, 1881; Alsace-Lorraine, France
- Died: April 25, 1942 (aged 60); Tucson, Arizona
- Education: Self taught
- Known for: Art; Illustrator, Drawing, Etching, Lithography
- Movement: Desert Landscapes, Desert plants ,

Alfred Rudolph (1881–1942) was an early 20th century artist, who worked in California and Arizona primarily as an etcher, lithographer, and graphite draftsman. His work focused on desert environments, mountains, plants, and romantic landscapes.

== Life and art ==
Alfred Rudolph was born Alfred Rudolph Otto Johannes Bruenauer-Lippert in Alsace-Loraine, Germany on September 21, 1881. Rudolph was the son of German educator and received schooling in European universities with a degree in mechanical engineering.

He visited the United States in 1909 and returned in 1910 naturalizing in 1915 and taking the name Alfred Rudolph.

He moved to Chicago and became the vice president and general manager of the American Ball Bearing Company. During World War I he served on the war board under Secretary Newton D. Baker. Following a decline in health he moved to the deserts of Nevada to recuperate. There he took up etching for the first time. Rudolph moved to Tucson in 1931 with his wife Margaret Maxon Rudolph and became a full-time artist.

Rudolph was a member of the Association of American Artists. He exhibited with the San Diego Fine Arts Library and the San Diego Art Guild and internationally. His work is in the permanent collection of the Cleveland Museum, the Smithsonian, Library of Congress, and the San Diego Museum.

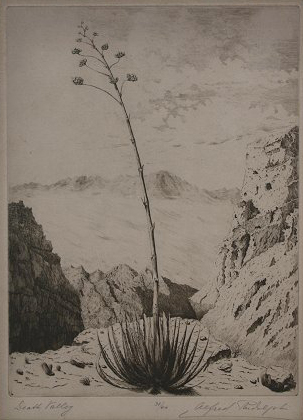
Alfred Rudolph desert etching

While convalescing from an illness at home, in January 1942, an exhibition was held at Leionne Salter’s Arizona Studio featuring his etchings, lithographs and pastels that featured his nocturnal and day-time desert landscapes. Three months later at the age of 60 Rudolph died in Tucson, Arizona on April 25, 1942.
