= Stanford Stevens =

American artist

- Born: Stanford Stevens; 1897; St. Albans, Vermont
- Died: December 20, 1974 (aged 76–77); Alamos, Mexico
- Education: Harvard
- Known for: Art; Illustrator, Drawing, Watercolor
- Movement: Landscapes, Watercolor, regionalism

Stanford Stevens (1897-1974) was an American artist who specialized in watercolor and drawing. He lived in and around Tucson, Arizona from the 1930s though his death in 1974 exhibiting extensively in the Southwest, throughout the United States and Mexico.

== Life ==
Stevens was born in St. Albans, Vermont in 1897. He received an A.B. from Harvard in 1919, specializing in Fine Arts. He studied at the Academia Julien in Paris for two years, and one year in New York City under George Pierce Ennis and Guy Pène du Bois.

Stevens exhibited at the Salon des Artistes Francais in Paris and leading watercolor shows throughout the United States most notably the American Water Color Society, the Boston Society of Watercolor Painters, and the Philadelphia Watercolor Show.

== Tucson, Arizona ==
In the 1930s Stevens moved to Tucson and for many years showed regularly at the Arizona Inn and was associated with the Gerry Peirce Gallery. At the start of World War II he took at job with Consolidated Vultee plant in Tucson, which manufactured aircraft.

He had numerous solo exhibitions including: Macbeth Gallery in New York; Copley Galleries, Boston; Gibbs Gallery, Charleston, South Carolina; Camelback Gallery, Phoenix, Arizona; Fine Arts Gallery, Tucson, Arizona; Pan American Gallery, San Antonio; Closson Galleries, Cincinnati; Joslyn Memorial Museum, Omaha; and in Houston, Mexico City, Guanajuato and Guadalajaro.

Stevens was a member of the 261 Gallery Group and had a solo exhibition at the gallery in April 1952. He was a member of the American Watercolor Society for over 25 years. His work can be found in the permanent collections of the Wood Gallery, Montpelier, Vermont; Rockland Gallery, Maine; and the Ford Foundation and International Business Machine Collections.

On December 20, 1974 Sevens died at his home in the colonial Mexican Silver town of Alamos. Mexico.

== Philosophy ==
Stevens wrote in his published “Notes for a Painting Class.” In 1956 “Most of watercolor painting is done best before you start to paint, that may be true of any form of art, but I think it applies most to watercolor. It is what you do beforehand, how you think out your subject, and how you plan its execution; those are the things that count most in the end.
