= List of United States post office murals in Alabama =

Following is a list of United States post office murals created in Alabama between 1934 and 1943.

Location	Mural title	Image	Artist	Date	Notes	NRHP listed
Atmore	The Letter Box		Anne Goldthwaite	1938		
Brewton	Logging		John Von Wicht	1939	oil on canvas, missing	
Enterprise	Saturday in Enterprise		Paul Arlt	1941	Relocated to the Enterprise Public Library	
Eutaw	The Countryside		Robert Gwathmey	1941		
Fairfield	Spirit of Steel		Frank Hartley Anderson	1938		
Fort Payne	Harvest at Fort Payne		Harwood Steiger	1938	Relocated in 2001 to Hunt Hall, part of the Hosiery Museum	
Hartselle	Cotton Scene		Ferol Sibley Warthen	1941	Relocated to the Hartselle Chamber of Commerce office in the historic train depot	
Haleyville	Reforestation		Hollis Holbrook	1940	tempera on gesso Missing	
Luverne	Cotton Field		Arthur Getz	1942		
Bay Minette	Removal of the County Seat from Daphne to Bay Minette		Hilton Leech	1939		
Montevallo	Early Settlers Weighing Cotton		William S. McCall	1938	Included in University of Montevallo Historic District	1990 CP
Monroeville	Harvesting		Arthur Leroy Bairnsfather	1939		
Oneonta	Local Agriculture-A.A.A. 1939		Aldis B. Browne	1939		
Ozark	Early Industry of Dale County		John Kelly Fitzpatrick	1938		
Phenix City	Cotton		John Kelly Fitzpatrick	1939	missing	
Russellville	Shipment of the First Iron Produced in Russellville		Conrad A. Albrizio	1938		
Tuskegee	The Road to Tuskegee		Anne Goldthwaite	1937		
Tuscumbia	Chief Tuscumbia Greets the Dickson Family		Jack McMillen	1939		
