= Julia Stockton Dinsmore =

American poet, rancher, and farmer

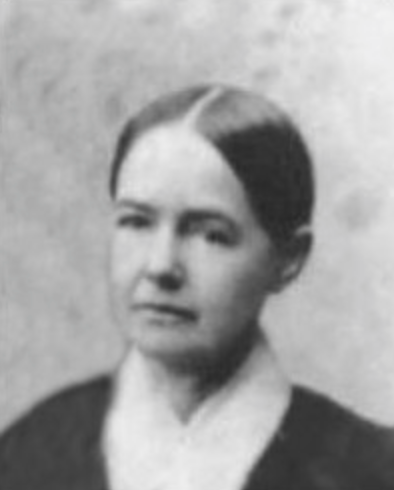
- Born: March 6, 1833; Terrebonne Parish, Louisiana
- Died: April 19, 1926 (aged 93); Santa Barbara, California
- Resting place: Dinsmore Homestead Cemetery, Kentucky
- Occupations: Farmer, sheep rancher, poet
- Relatives: Isabella Greenway (great niece, Arizona's first congresswoman), Benjamin Goodrich (cousin)

Julia Stockton Dinsmore (March 6, 1833 – April 19, 1926) was an American poet best remembered for her association with the Dinsmore Homestead in Kentucky, now on the National Register of Historic Places and a museum open to the public. She raised sheep and grew grapes on the homestead farm. A collection of her poems, Verses and Sonnets, was published in 1910.

== Personal life ==
Julia Stockton Dinsmore was born on the Black Bayou Plantation in Terrebonne Parish, Louisiana on March 6, 1833. Her parents were Martha Macomb (1797–1859) and James Dinsmore (1790–1872), who was a lawyer and one of the owners of a cotton and sugar plantation. Martha was the daughter of Alexander Macomb of New York, a land speculator. Julia had eight siblings. Julia enjoyed the birds, animals, and flowers along the bayou as a child. She attended a school in Lexington, Kentucky with her sisters beginning at age six.

The family of eleven moved to Boone County, Kentucky in the Belleview Bottoms (now called Belleview) area in 1842. Before the move, Dinsmore's father had a house built on the 371-acre farm, which had hills, ponds, and woods. The farm grew grapes and raised sheep. Willows were gathered for basket weaving. James Dinsmore owned up to 15 enslaved people until 1865 and had white tenant farmers to operate the farm. Dinsmore cared for and taught the farm workers' children.

Dinsmore was tutored at home by Eugenia Wadsworth until she was about sixteen years old when she was sent to the Cincinnati Female Seminary. She was taught by Margaret Coxe, author of The Young Lady's Companion: In a Series of Letters. She played the piano, sang, and was proficient in foreign languages, Latin, French, Greek, German, and Italian.

Her sister Isabella died following the birth of her second child. Her brother-in-law Charles E. Flandrau sent his daughters Martha and Sarah, known as Patty and Sally, to be raised by their aunt.

In 1888, Dinsmore received an inheritance of $10,000 (equivalent to $358,333 in 2025), which allowed her to travel with Patty and Sally.

After suffering from a hip fracture, Dinsmore died at Sally's home in Santa Barbara, California on April 19, 1926. She was interred at the Dinsmore Homestead's cemetery.

== Farmer ==
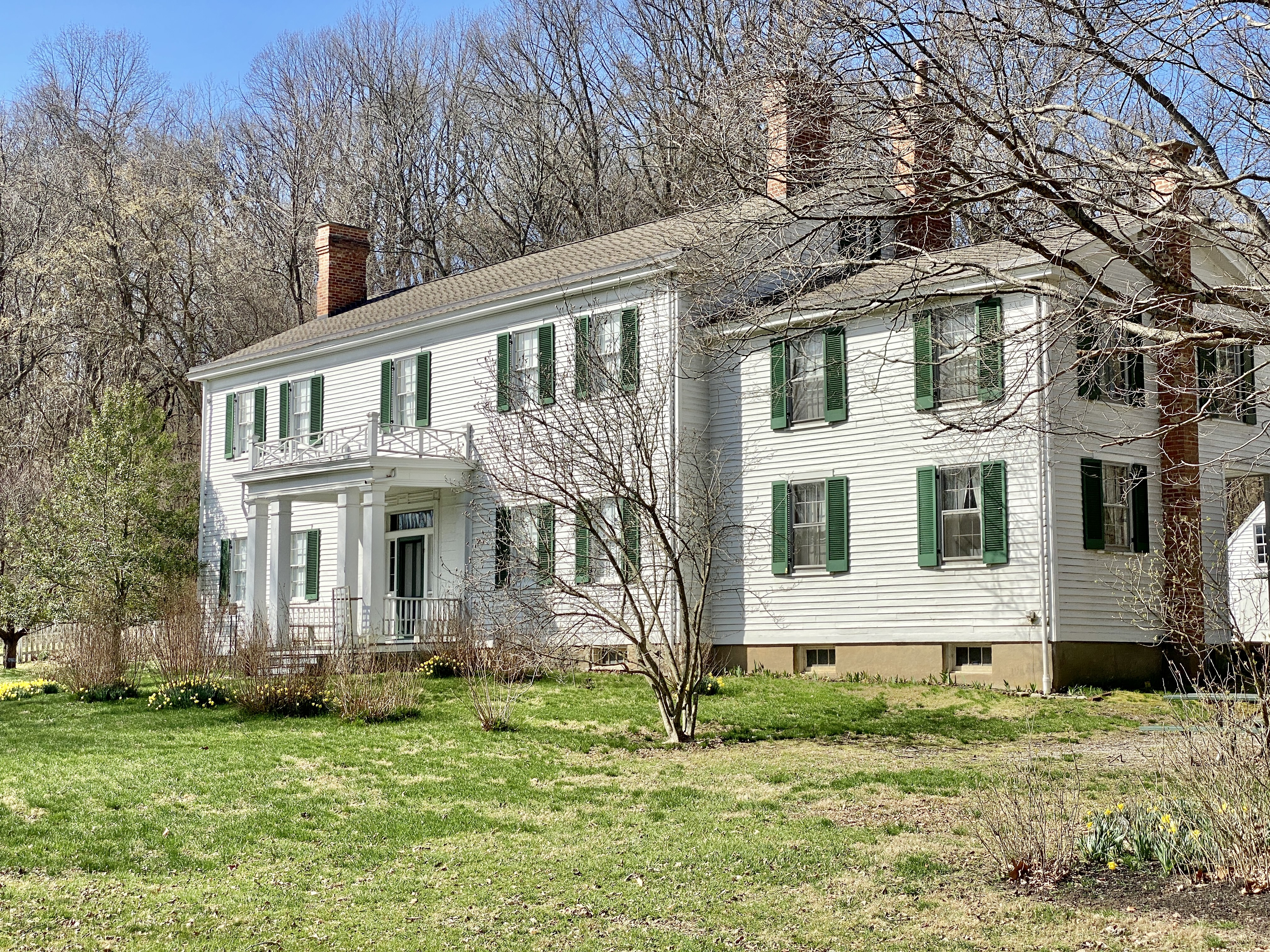
Built in 1841–1842, the Dinsmore Homestead sits along Burlington Pike (Kentucky Route 18) near the small town of Belleview, Kentucky, and was purchased by James and Martha Dinsmore, natives of Louisiana, in 1839, and was where the family, with the assistance of several enslaved people, farmed the land.

Following her father's death in 1872, Dinsmore inherited farm, as well as debts that he owed.

== Writer ==
She particularly enjoyed writing poetry and sent poems to be printed in the Times-Democrat of New Orleans. In 1910, Doubleday, Page & Company published a collection under the title, Verses and Sonnets, including Noon in a Blue Green Pasture and Love Among the Roses. One of the poems, Louisiana Buttons, may have been about a man that she loved who fought and died during the Civil War. The book garnered favorable reviews. Through her niece Patty, she became acquainted with Teddy Roosevelt, who corresponded with Dinsmore about her works.

She kept a journal for most of this time, giving insight into her life and the challenges of operating the farm.
