= James R. Welker House =

Historic house in Arizona, United States

- U.S. National Register of Historic Places
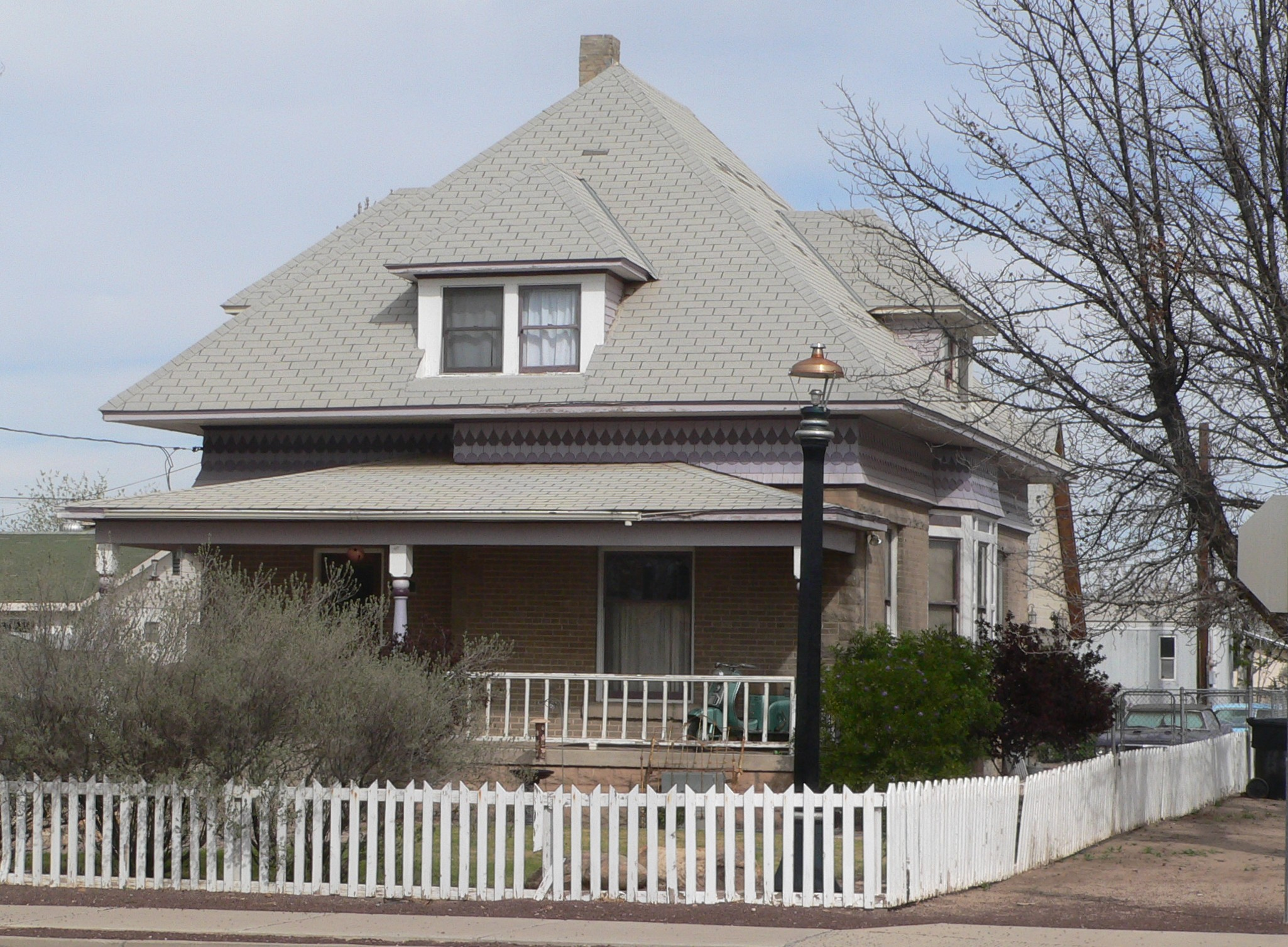
- House in 2015

- Location within Arizona Location within the United States
- Location: 1127 S. Central Ave., Safford, Arizona
- Coordinates: 32.82657°N 109.71098°W
- Area: less than one acre
- Built: 1915
- Architectural style: vernacular Queen Anne, Queen Anne Transitional
- MPS: Safford MRA
- NRHP reference No.: 87002582
- Added to NRHP: February 9, 1988

The James R. Welker House, at 1127 Central in Safford, Arizona, was built in 1915. It was listed on the National Register of Historic Places in 1988.

It is a rectangular single-family brick house which includes "traditional" Queen Anne-style features such as shingling below its cornices. The house is surrounded by a low white picket fence.

It was associated with James Welker, who served on Safford's city council and as its postmaster in 1939, and was a merchant.

Welker was a Mormon who arrived in Safford in 1883, and along with other Mormons, was amazed at frontier practices. According to him, the cowboys "would ride into a town, go straight to the saloon, and commence shooting the place up. They were expert with the pistol too." He stated: "I've seen very wonderful shots among those cowboys. They did not do much killing around here, but they were pretty wild and did about as they pleased.'

== See also ==
- National Register of Historic Places listings in Graham County, Arizona
