= Dinsmore Homestead =

Historic house in Kentucky, United States

- Dinsmore House
- U.S. National Register of Historic Places
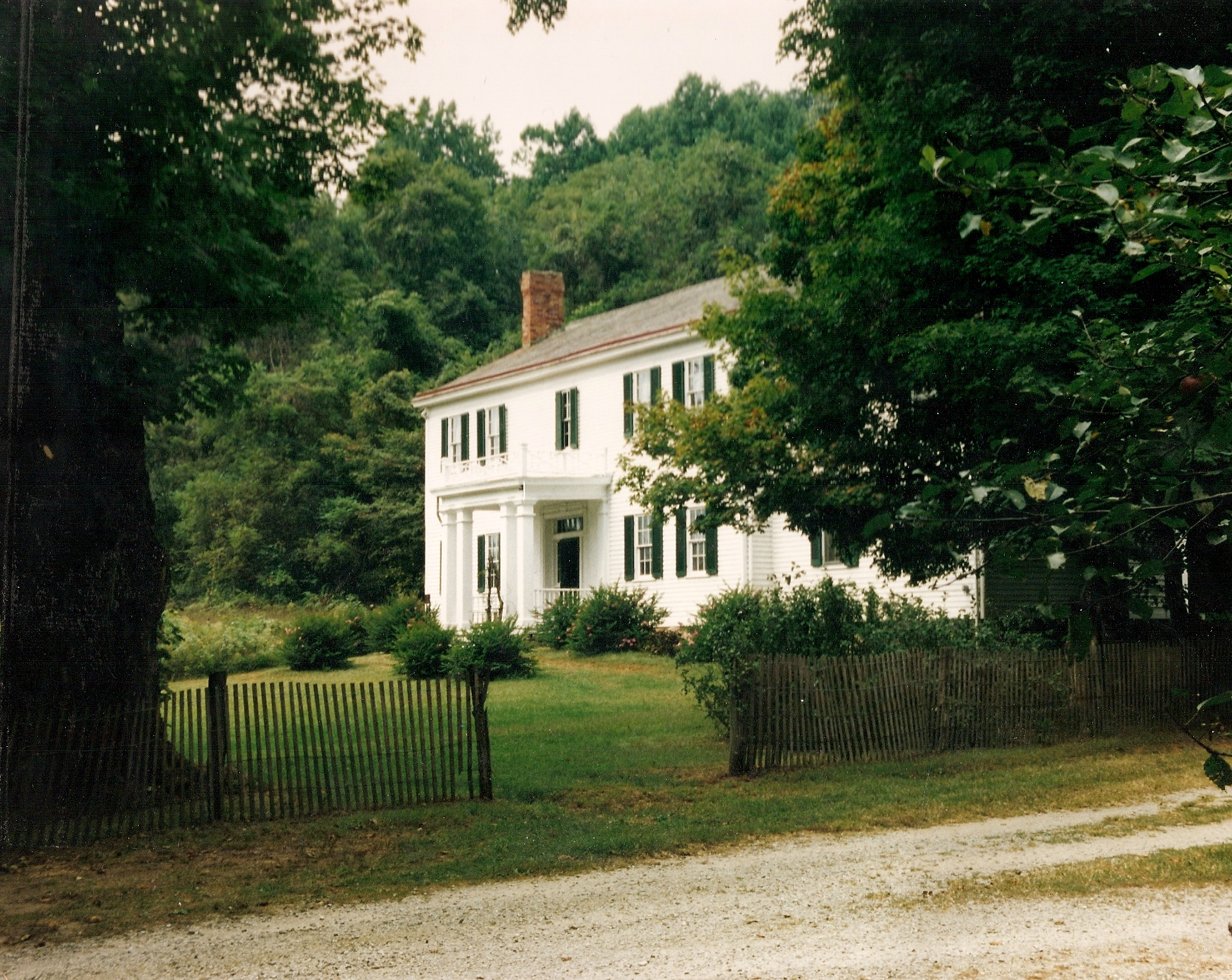
- Main house at the Dinsmore Homestead (1842)

- Location within Kentucky Location within the United States
- Nearest city: Burlington, Kentucky
- Coordinates: 39°0′3″N 84°48′49″W
- Built: 1841
- Built by: John Brady
- Architect: Dinsmore Bros.
- Architectural style: Greek Revival, Federal
- NRHP reference No.: 79000962 (original); 05001307 (increase)

Significant dates
- Added to NRHP: March 28, 1979
- Boundary increase: November 13, 2023

The Dinsmore Homestead is a historic house museum. The property contains a house completed in 1842 and several outbuildings. It is located at 5656 Burlington Pike (Kentucky Route 18), 6.5 miles (10.5 km) west of Burlington, Kentucky.

== Overview ==
In 1839, James and Martha Dinsmore purchased approximately 700 acres (2.8 km^{2}) in Boone County, Kentucky. He and his family, which included daughters, Isabella Dinsmore, Julia Dinsmore, and Susan Dinsmore, settled there, and with the help of slave labor, raised sheep and grew grapes and willows for a basket-making business that was overseen by German immigrants.

The house is notable for containing all original artifacts that were purchased by the family primarily in Cincinnati, Ohio, and southern Indiana. Some of the stores they shopped at over the years included Shillito's, McAlpin's, Gest & Bruns, and Hunnewell, Hill & Co., all early Cincinnati establishments.

The primary sources belonging to the Foundation allow docents to highlight the Dinsmore family's connections to people like: George Washington, Alexander Macomb, Silas Dinsmoor, James Bowie, John Bell, Samuel Bell, John Ross, Henry Clay, Andrew Jackson, General Alexander Macomb, Margaret Coxe, Mathew Brady, Nellie Taft, Enid Yandell, Tyrone Power, Sarah Gibson Humphreys, Benjamin F. Goodrich, Randall L. Gibson, Julia Marlowe, Charles E. Flandrau, Charles M. Flandrau, Grace Flandrau, John W. Riddle, Theodate Pope Riddle, David Goodrich, Robert H. M. Ferguson, Ronald Munro Ferguson, John Jacob Astor IV, Isabella Selmes Ferguson Greenway King, John Campbell Greenway, Theodore Roosevelt, Henry Cabot Lodge, Corinne Roosevelt Robinson, Douglas Robinson, Bamie Roosevelt, Eleanor Roosevelt, Franklin D. Roosevelt, Corinne Robinson Alsop, William Loving, James Henry Breasted, Gutzon Borglum.

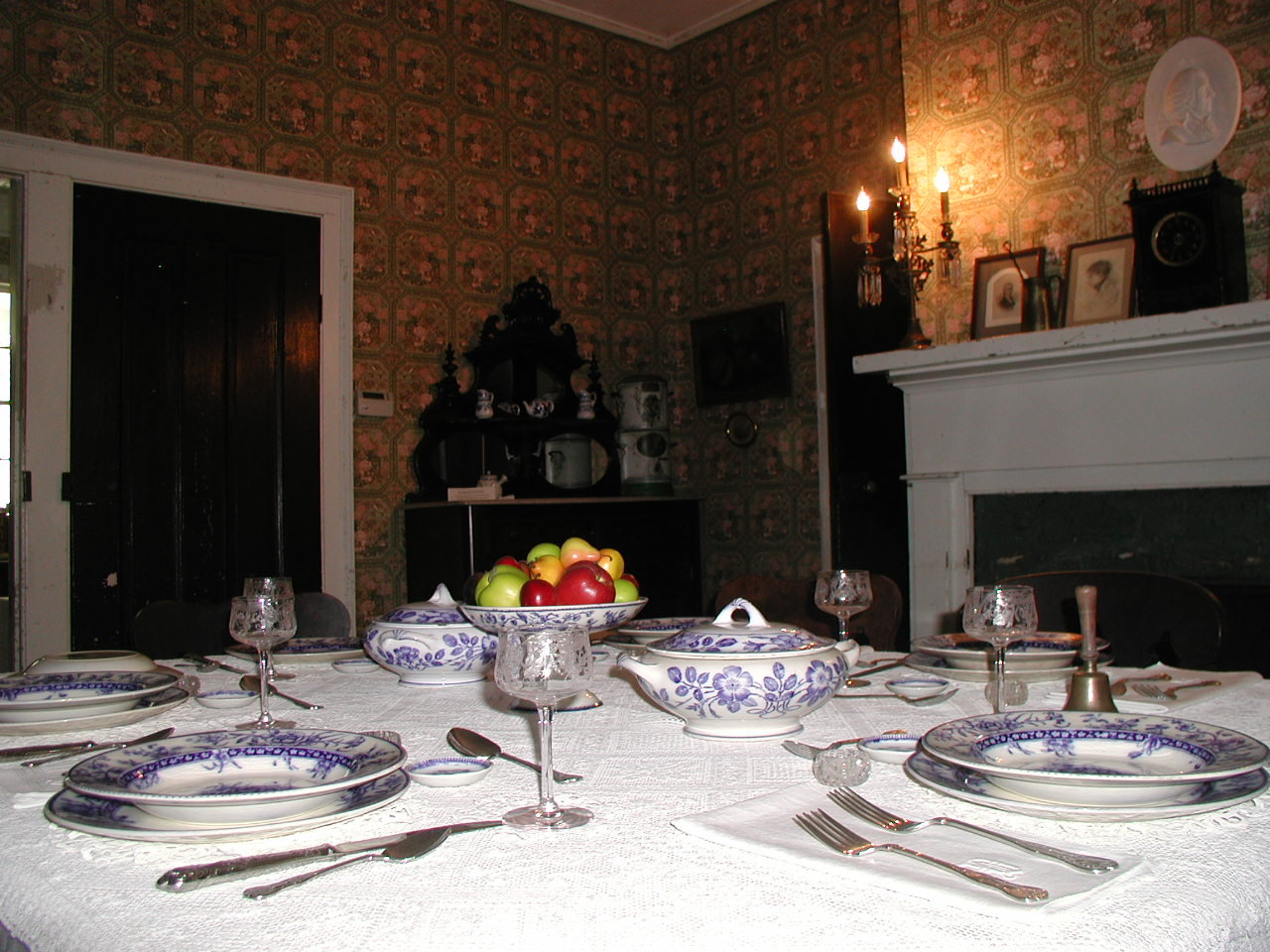
Dining table at the Dinsmore Homestead

The Dinsmore family, who lived in the historic home from 1842 through 1926, were associated with many historical events and trends that help to inform an understanding of local, regional, national, and global history. Some of the interesting events members of the family were involved in and wrote about include: relations between the U. S. Government and the Cherokee and Choctaw, early Republic land speculations, (for example, Macomb's Purchase), the Texas Revolution of 1836, Early Republic politics, the Adams Express Company, the American Civil War, the Spanish–American War, the sinking of the Titanic, the sinking of the Lusitania, and World War I.

== Current use ==
In 1987, the Dinsmore Homestead Foundation purchased the home and approximately 30 acres (120,000 m^{2}) to preserve the site. A collection of nearly 90,000 pages of family letters, journals and business records have been preserved on microfilm for use at the Dinsmore Homestead.

The home is open for guided tours and the grounds are open to the public.

Significant focal points of the Homestead's history include, but are not limited to women's history, African American history, the history of slavery and Reconstruction, Native American history, agricultural history, and the histories of Mississippi, Louisiana, and Kentucky.
