= Leionne Salter =

- Born: Leionne Salter; 1892; Minnesota
- Died: 1972 (aged 79–80); Tucson, Arizona
- Education: Minneapolis School of Art
- Known for: Art; Interior Design
- Movement: Spanish revival, pueblo revival, Spanish Colonial Revival

Leionne Salter (1892–1972) was a key figure in Tucson, Arizona's early 20th century revival movement that provided the region with a distinct and unique romantic style that blended of influences from Mexico, the Sonoran Desert, and California. Salter credited her design inspiration from desert flora, fauna and from the art of “old Mexico.”

Leionne Salter was a native of Minnesota and graduated from the Minneapolis School of Art. She was a member of the American Institute of Decorators. Her husband, Clifford R. Salter, worked for the Western Electric Company and during World War II was employed at Davis–Monthan Air Force Base doing radar work.

== Arizona Hut ==
Both Leionne and Clifford worked for Isabella Greenway King’s furniture manufacturing studio "Arizona Hut". Clifford served as business manager and Leionne as artist and designer. The Arizona Hut was established by Greenway after World War I as a philanthropic endeavor to assist disabled veterans and their wives develop job skills in the fabrication of toys and furniture. The furniture company was impacted by the 1929 financial crash and Greenway developed the Arizona Inn to keep the veterans employed.

== Arizona Studio ==
Leionne and Clifford opened the Arizona Studio in 1932. With Leionne managing the design and painting and Clifford managing the business. The Arizona Studio was located at 18 West Broadway in downtown Tucson in the Historic Charles O. Brown House (Old Adobe Patio), artist Gerry Peirce also had a studio in the building. Examples of Salter’s glass painting can be found on original surviving windows in that building.

== Major Work ==
Leionne Salter was an interior designer, screen and mural painter. Her significant murals and commissions included the Arizona Inn (Tucson), Darling Shop (Tucson), El Conquistador Hotel (Tucson), Bungalow Inn (Tucson) and the Casa Blanca (Scottsdale). Salter drew on a design philosophy that working with fabrics and colors into a decorative patterns to represent her client. Salter is also recognized for her stylistic floral window paintings found on Historic Homes throughout Tucson and Southern Arizona. Salter’s design commissions included the redecorating of the El Conquistador Hotel in 1950s; significant homes throughout the Tucson region including “Indian Hill Home,” and numerous churches including the chapel on the La Osa ranch at Sasabe. The studio produced furniture, tin-work, lampshades, decorative screens and various accessories in copper, tin and wood. The Salters are known to have employed two skilled craftsman to fabricate Leionne’s designs. Frank Armenta, who started with them in 1932, fabricated all the metal framework, and Salvador Colmanero, a blind artisan who produced all the fiber cord work and caning for seats and backs.

Salter lived in a 1935 Pueblo Revival home in the Historic El Montevideo Estates, 3801 E. Calle Cortez, in Tucson Arizona

Salter is believed to have been involved with the interior design of the Desert Sanatorium (today, Tucson Medical Center) in the late 1920s. Additionally, architects during the period sourced details from the Arizona Studio. Architect Josias Joesler utilized Salter tin work in many of his projects in Tucson and the Catalina Foothills.
