= Merritt Starkweather =

American architect (1891–1972)

Merritt H. Starkweather
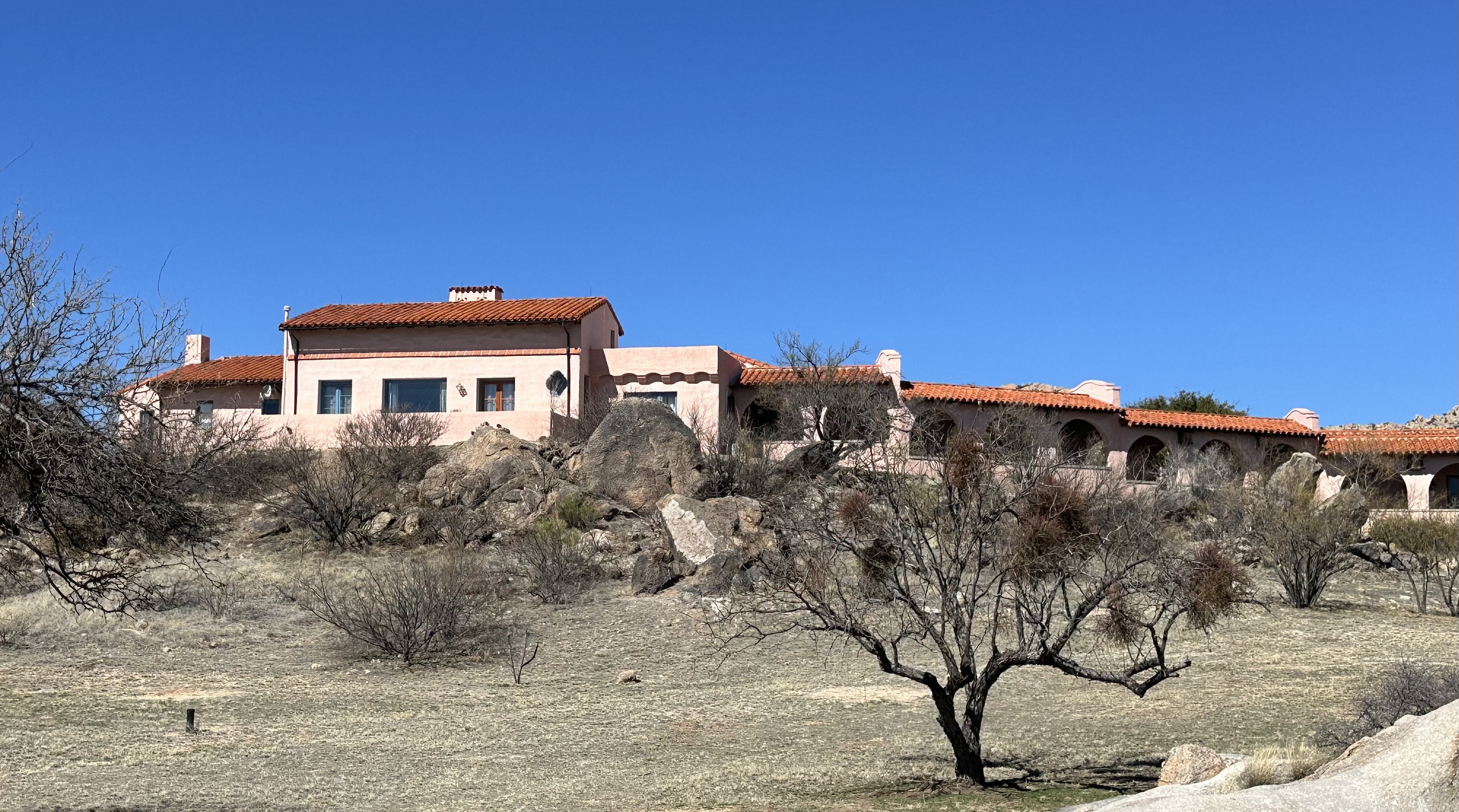
- The Amerind Foundation's building was designed by Tucson architect Merritt Starkweather.
- Born: Merritt H. Starkweather; 1891; Oshkosh, Wisconsin
- Died: 1972 (aged 80–81); Tucson, Arizona
- Occupation: Architect
- Known for: Arizona Inn

Merritt H. Starkweather (1891–1972) was a Tucson, Arizona, architect and civic leader. A native of Oshkosh, Wisconsin, after visiting the 1915 Panama–California Exposition, he moved to Tucson and began working in an elegantly simplified Spanish Colonial Revival Style architecture. Several of his works are listed for their architecture on the National Register of Historic Places.

== Life and work ==
Starkweather buildings reflect a sophisticated understanding of the Art Deco movement – both the Starweather Home on Adams Street and in El Encanto Estates are examples of Pueblo Deco Style. Perhaps his most significant building is the Arizona Inn: a series of lush courtyards and pink plastered buildings commissioned by Isabella Greenway.

Starkweather was a founder of the Tucson Rodeo. In 1937, he founded the Arizona chapter of the American Institute of Architects and in 1968 was named an AIA Fellow.

He founded the Tucson Blueprint Company before World War I.

Starkweather married Otilia Jettinghoff (Lily) on August 6, 1921 and died in 1972 in Tucson.

== Major Tucson buildings ==
- Carrillo School
- D.C. Doolen Junior High School
- Drachman School
- St. John's School
- Tucson High School Stadium
- Ignacio Bonillas School
- Tucson City Shops
- Marshall Stores in University Square
- City fire stations
- Arizona Inn, NRHP-listed
- American Legion Club
- Frontier Village Buildings
- St. Mary's Addition and Sister's Home
- St. Joseph Academy
- Grandstand and bucking chutes at Tucson's Rodeo Grounds
- South Lawn Crematorium
- McClellan Stores
- Hal Burns Flower Shop
- Consumers Market on South 6th Avenue
- Myerson's Store Building on Congress and Church
- Masonic Temple Addition
- M.H. Starkweather stores, 6th and Tucson Blvd.
- Multiple residences in El Encanto Estates
- One or more works in Indian House Community Residential Historic District, roughly bounded by 5th St., E. Wash, Kane Estates, and Sahura St. Tucson, AZ, NRHP-listed

== Other major projects ==
- Woman's Club, Safford, Arizona, NRHP-listed
- School at Pima Arizona
- Elk's Lodge, Nogales, Arizona
- Amerind Foundation, Dragoon, Arizona – home, servants' quarters, museums.
- Casa Grande Hospital, 1951

== Sources ==
- Arizona Historical Society, unpublished biographical sketch.
- Nequette, Anne M. and Jeffery, R. Brooks. A Guide to Tucson Architecture. University of Arizona Press 2002.
