= Woman's Club (Safford, Arizona) =

- U.S. National Register of Historic Places
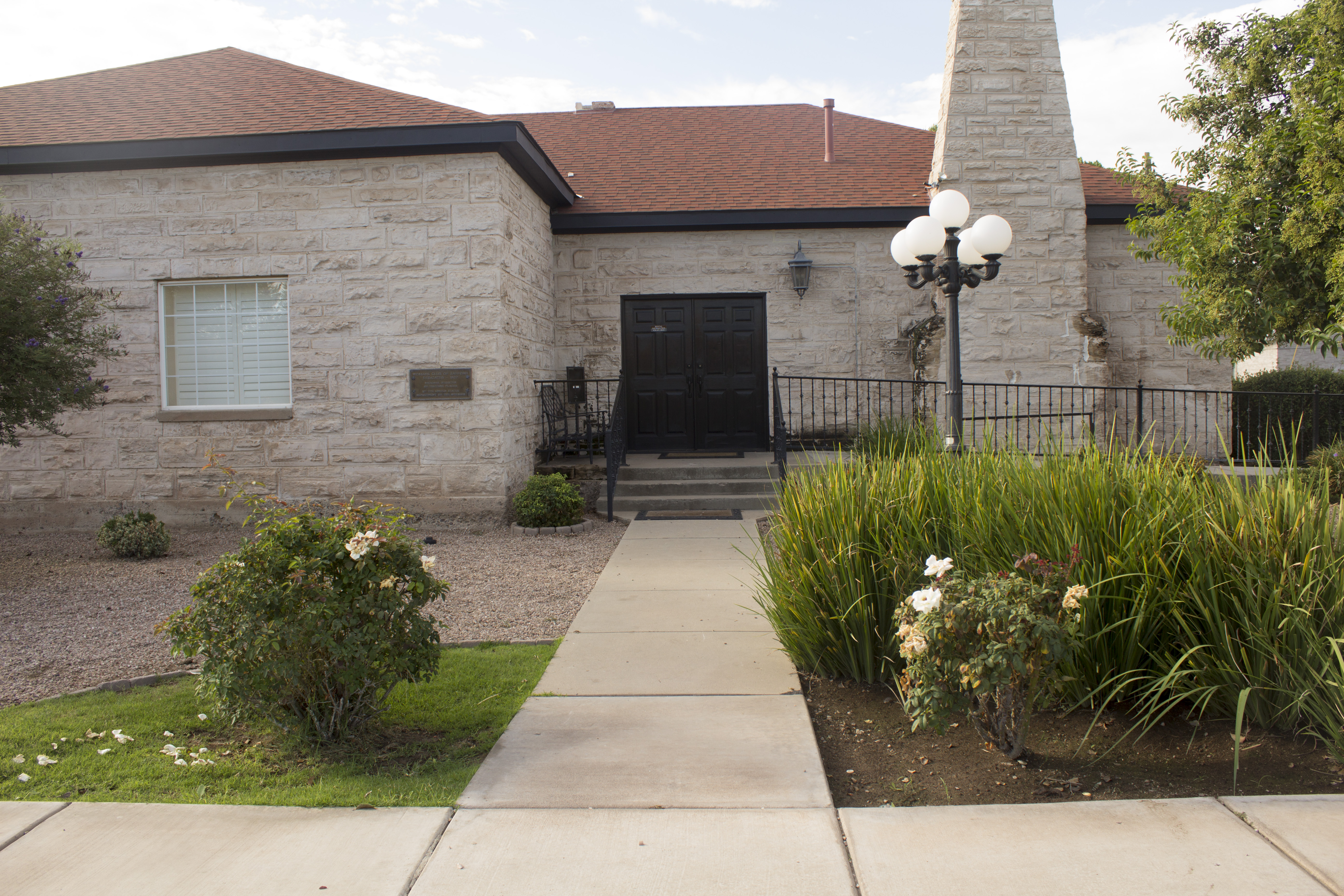

- Location within Arizona
- Location: 215 Main, Safford, Arizona
- Coordinates: 32.83306°N 109.70979°W
- Area: less than one acre
- Built: 1930
- Architect: M.H. Starkweather
- Architectural style: Bungalow/craftsman, Period Revival
- MPS: Safford MRA
- NRHP reference No.: 87002586
- Added to NRHP: May 12, 1988

The Woman's Club in Safford, Arizona, United States, is located at 215 Main and was built in 1930. It was listed on the National Register of Historic Places in 1988.

The building is constructed of cut stone in an ashlar pattern. It was designed by M. H. Starkweather (1891-1972) of Tucson.

"The building is considered to have architectural significance at the local level for its representation of a late Bungalow style and as a work of a master. Accordingly, it is nominated under criterion "c."

== See also ==
- National Register of Historic Places listings in Graham County, Arizona
