= Gilpin Airlines =

Gilpin Airlines, formally re-incorporated in 1932 as G & G Gilpin Air Lines Company was an air charter and airline company operated in California, Arizona, and the Mexican states of Sonora and Baja California from 1929 (97 years ago) to 1934 (92 years ago). A residual of the company persisted in Arizona as a flight school and charter business, operating out of Gilpin Field in Tucson, Arizona for several years. The airline is notable for its ownership by Arizona pioneer and politician Isabella Greenway, and for its involvement with trans-border traffic during the days of Prohibition.

== History ==
Gilpin Air Lines emerged from the Depression-related failure of a California busline turned airline, Pickwick Airways, bought by Charles William “Bill” Gilpin in 1929. He had been one of Pickwick’s pilots, and the new outfit operated most of the same airplanes. Pickwick Airways was part of the San Francisco-based Pickwick Corporation, owner of the Pickwick Hotel. Gilpin, who learned to fly during World War I, had been an associate of Mrs. Greenway, Arizona’s first Congresswoman and owner of far-flung business interests in the state. As the airline was increasingly unprofitable, Greenway invested in it and eventually became the owner, thus the G & G moniker. At the time of Greenway’s take-over, the airline had about thirty employees, with G. L. Slaybaugh was the general manager. Greenway used the airline much for personal and business travel, especially in her political campaigns in the thinly populated state. Gilpin often acted as her pilot. He had been chauffeur for Greenway’s deceased husband, and is recorded as flying numerous flights in the Southwest in the 1926-30 timespan, including in an aircraft of his own design and manufacture.

Bill Gilpin was killed in a weather-related accident near Toluca, Mexico in July 1932, on a flight from San Diego to Mexico City. On 11 May 1933, Greenway appointed Elliott Roosevelt, the son of newly inaugurated President Franklin D. Roosevelt, to be the airline’s manager. He was 22 years old and had no significant flying experience. The job was a favor to Greenway’s close friend Eleanor Roosevelt. The new manager served only a few weeks before abandoning the job, but attracted considerable press attention to the struggling outfit. Despite Elliott Roosevelt’s requests, the airline did not obtain the air mail contracts that were then essential for profitability. After his departure and the end of Prohibition, Greenway became convinced of the small airline’s unviability, and she closed it down in January 1934. However, she asked her godson, Walter Douglas, Jr. to continue to operate a flight school business with the name.

Greenway's ownership of the airline and familiarity with aviation was a reason she, as the only Democrat, broke publicly with family friend President Franklin D. Roosevelt over the Air Mail Scandal of 1934.

== Equipment ==
In May 1933, Gilpin Airlines had only five aircraft left: a single-engine, six-seat Fairchild Model 71; a small Ryan Model B-5; and, flying most of the route operations, three triple-engined Bach Air Yachts (models 3-CT-6 and 3-CT-8). In 1929, Pickwick Airways had owned six single-engine Ryans and a number of Bach Air Yachts.

== Routes ==
The airline's predecessor Pickwick Airways operated from March 1929 to spring 1930 on a route network that originated in San Diego but extended as far as San Francisco and Guatemala. Gilpin Airlines, headquartered in Glendale, California, operated several routes in the Southwest, including one between Palm Springs and Grand Central Air Terminal, Glendale, serving Los Angeles. However, the chief source of revenue came from a route between Los Angeles and Agua Caliente Racetrack, now in Tijuana, Mexico. During the Prohibition era, the Agua Caliente resort operated a casino, horse racing venue, and a resort hotel. The airline’s brochure stated a fare of $7.50 for this route, which included stops in San Diego and other locations as requested. The airline also operated charters in the Southwest.

An accident occurred in Toluca with a flight carrying James Crofton, the president of the Agua Caliente resort, along with his secret wife Mona Rico, to meet with Mexican president Pascual Ortiz Rubio.

Notable aviator Pancho Barnes flew for Pickwick Airways for publicity.

In May 1933, the airline reported it had four pilots and nineteen employees. That month, the airline flew 155 revenue trips in 172 hours, carrying 482 passengers.

== Legacy ==
G & G Gilpin Air Lines continued after 1934 as a Tucson flight school home based on Tucson Municipal Field. In 1940, the operation moved to Gilpin Field, a new airfield along (what became) I-10 northwest of town. Isabella Greenway’s godson, Tucson aviation pioneer Walter Douglas, Jr. owned and operated the field and the now fixed-base operator Gilpin Air Lines. The business operated from a large hangar at this field. Gilpin Field later became municipal Freeway Airport (1959), which was closed in 1978. Douglas also operated Grand Canyon Airlines.

The Pima Air & Space Museum in Tucson exhibits a Waco UPF-7 and a Fleet Model 2 trainer in Gilpin Air Lines paint, ca. 1944. The Gilpin Hangar and control tower, now part of an industrial park, are still in existence at West Romero Road, Tucson.

== See also ==
- List of defunct airlines of the United States
