= 261 Gallery =

Art gallery

The 261 Gallery was a gallery and art center located in Tucson, Arizona within United States established by Ruby Warren Newby. It served as an important experimental modern art center in Southern Arizona that supported emerging and established modern artists, exhibited cutting-edge and avant-garde work, and enhanced and built a progressive artistic culture in the American southwest. Opened in 1948, the gallery was named for its address, 261 North Court Street in Tucson, Arizona.

== Ruby Warren Newby ==
Ruby Warren Newby was born on July 28, 1886, in Goff, Kansas. She attended schools in Kansas City, Missouri before enrolling and receiving a Bachelor of Science degree in education at Southern College. She continued her education at Rollins College and received a Carnegie Foundation scholarship. Between 1934 and 1936 she served as an Art Supervisor under the Public Works Administration (PWA) in New York City.

Newby studied ceramics and continued her education and graduate work at Harvard University and Columbia University. For eight years she held the position at her Alma maters as head of the art department of Rollins College in Winter Park, Florida, and art director at Southern College. She also served as the director of the Southern States Art League. During her career, she oversaw and taught art classes at the Metropolitan Museum of Art in New York, at the Brooklyn Museum, the Kansas City Art Institute, and the Teachers College, Columbia University. She wrote numerous articles on art education for professional journals. Newby had two daughters Martha May Brewer and. Betty Mireur and a son John D. Newby.

Newby moved to Tucson in 1946 from Kansas City and took a position teaching art at Reddington School and Amphitheater School.

== Gallery and art center ==
Assessing the cultural offerings of Tucson, Newby felt there was a need for a non-profit arts space that could offer classes, exhibit progressive cutting-edge non-traditional work, and promote emerging artists. Living in an old mud adobe “Transformed Sonoran corner row house” at 261 North Court Street, (today part of the National Register of Historic Places El Presidio Historic District), Newby converted part of the building into an art center which opened on November 1, 1948.

The space launched with an inaugural class schedule, Newby teaching adult classes, and Virginia Callies leading children's arts and crafts programs. Newby set up a ceramics studio focused on experimental work in ceramic glazes using native ores and minerals. Newby curated group exhibitions and invited leading Tucson artists to exhibit work.

The first exhibit was a group show that included work by Newby, Stanford Stevens, Ray Strange, Hutton Webster, Jr., Mac Schweitzerr, Pat Fitzpatrick, Gertrude Briggs, Ray Edwards, and E.A. Wales. The first solo show was 35 paintings by Abe Sotsky. The second exhibition was the work of Mac Schweitzer.

261 developed a non-profit cooperative. It was closely associated with the newly established Tucson “Independent Artist Group” which cultivated and supported young modern artists. During the following three years, Newby mounted significant exhibitions, legitimizing and supporting the careers of new artists in Post WWII Tucson and Arizona. Through the gallery and her support of the arts, Newby became an important figure in the post-WWII cultural development of the city. She served as a member of the board of directors of the Tucson Fine Arts Society, Tucson Festival committee, and was part of the Gamma Phi Sorority.

Art critic Byrd Stanley writing in 1952 notes, “As an educator, she always took a special interest in talent not yet recognized by the general public and her interest in people was always more important than practical questions of who could pay gallery fees when they were due or whose work would sell fastest.”

== 261 Gallery Group ==
Newby invited a panel of five curators and artists to participate in the selection of art to be exhibited. The group included Newby and John Maul, The panel would become known as the first interaction of the “261 Gallery Group.”

Newby's health deteriorated and she was forced to close the gallery on January 13, 1953. A group of artists, friends, and supporters worked with Newby to ensure the space would reopen on February 17, 1952. The organizing committee was chaired by Anne Peck, with Lee Lizberg, Ada Robinson, Nora Loerpabel, and Francis O’Brian with John Maul serving as exhibits chairman Mac Schweitzer, and Winifred Wise gallery chairman and Harrison Moore installations. Madeline Schutzandk, Mildred Fish, and Lou Little worked on the advertisement. The Tucson Citizen newspaper noted at the time “The people who have a hand in the project are not all members of the 261 Gallery. They are not even all artists. But they all want to carry on Ruby's dream for Tucson as an arts community and they all (though some of them like Pricilla Peirce of the Print Room, have their own galleries want 261 to continue).

On February 22, 1952, Newby died after an extended illness. The group continued over the 1952–53 season to present over a dozen exhibitions. The Gallery Group now comprised a large number of Southern Arizona's leading artists and students. At the end of the season, the 261 Gallery Group announced they would be moving from the Court Street space to the Temple of Music and Art gallery. Sally Petty would continue to serve as gallery manager.

The 261 Gallery Group announced in October 1954 that it would disband.

== Revival and closure ==
In February 1963 Hallie Matlock announced that she would reopen the 261 Gallery with an exhibition of work by Bruce Mcgrew on March 3. The gallery remained open for a year. The last exhibition was the work of Jack Stuck. In February 1964 Matlock closed the 261 Gallery for the last time.

== Legacy ==
The 261 Gallery and Ruby Warren Newby's patronage was an important period in Tucson's post-WWII artistic development, growth, and popularization of modern art in Southern Arizona. The creation of a non-profit cooperative gallery allowed the presentation of artwork that was focused on creative development and less on salability. Although the existence of the gallery was brief it hosted over 30 shows and created a stage to highlight Avant-garde young artists and push ideas of art and creativity.

The creation of the gallery and its importance to the culture of the Southwest was featured on the international radio program Voice of America, on April 22, 1952.

== See also ==
- Abstract expressionism
- Modern Art
- Surrealism
