= Hal Empie =

US Cartoonist, Illustrator, Pharmacist

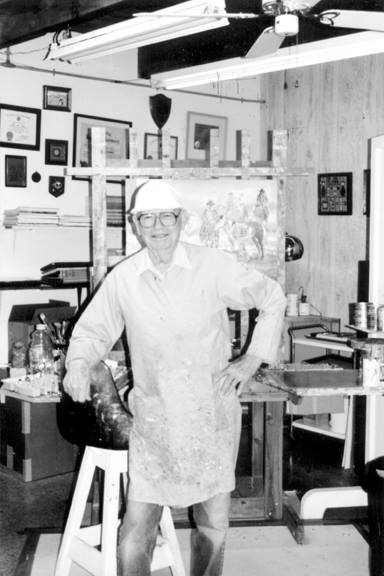
- Born: Hart Haller Empie; 1909; Safford, Arizona Territory
- Died: 2002 (aged 92–93)
- Known for: Painting, Illustration
- Website: http://www.halempiestudio-gallery.com

Hart Haller (Hal) Empie (1909–2002) was an American artist, cartoonist, illustrator, teacher and pharmacist. He was best known for his portrayals of places and people of the American Southwest

== Early life ==
Hal Empie was born in a dirt-floored, one-room adobe near Safford Arizona (territory) to pioneer settlers Allie and Hart Empie. As a young man, he worked at the Best Drug Store while attending grammar school. Upon graduation in 1927, he entered the University of Arizona in pre-med and then the Capitol College of Pharmacy in Denver Colorado. After passing exams in Colorado and Arizona, Hal was issued a special license to practice pharmacy before the age of twenty one, making him the youngest licensed pharmacist in Arizona History.

In 1929 Hal married Louise Reinhardt and in 1934 they purchased the drugstore in nearby Duncan, Arizona. He set up his easel in his pharmacy and painted between filling prescriptions.

== Career ==
A self-taught artist, Hal Empie refused to copy photographs. His only art lessons were six weeks studying the old master techniques with European master Frederic Taubes.

Artistic success began very early in Hal's career. National press brought invitationals including: The Museum of Modern Art, the Polish Embassy, and the Los Angeles County Museum. He was in his twenties when he was first recognized by the American Federation of Arts in Washington D.C..

As a cartoonist, Hal created the famous Empie Kartoon Kards, the first western cartoon postcard copyright. He was a major contributor to early issues of Arizona Highways (magazine). Postcards were marketed in thirty-eight states. Original printings are housed in the Archives Center, National Museum of American History, and The Smithsonian.

After a major Gila River flood in Duncan, the Empies moved to Tubac, Arizona and built the Hal Empie Studio and Gallery in 1986. Hal and Louise were married seventy-two years, raising three children. Hal painted his entire life. His career spanned over three quarters of a century, and at the time of his passing in 2002 he was the oldest continuous resident artist in Arizona

== Recognition ==
- Duncan, Arizona- Outstanding Citizen Award, 1939
- Arizona State Board of Pharmacy – 50 Years of Pharmacy, 1979
- University of Arizona Alumni Association – Distinguished Citizen Award, 1980
- History of Arizona Advisory Committee – Certificate of Recognition, 1982
- Arizona Pharmacy Board- Honorary Doctorate of Pharmacy, 1982
- Arizona Pharmacy Association- Honorary President, 1983
- Hal Empie Day- Safford, Arizona
- Key to the City- Safford, Arizona

== Museum Collections ==
- Amerind Museum
- Phippen Museum of Western Art
- Smithsonian National Museum of American History
- Billy Ireland Cartoon Library and Museum
- Syracuse University Library Special Collections
- Tucson Museum of Art
- Tubac Center of The Arts
- State of Arizona Supreme Court Building
- University of Arizona Pharmacy Museum
- Arizona State Capitol Library

== Additional Resources ==
1. Who's Who In American Art, Volume 3. R. R. Bowker, 1940
2. Who's Who In American Art, Volume IV. American Federation of Arts, 1947
3. Who's Who In The West. Chicago: Marquis - Who's Who, Inc., 1951
4. Who's Who In American Art. Bowker, 1961
5. Gilbert, Dorothy, ed. Who's Who In American Art. Washington D.C.: American Federation of Arts, 1962
6. Manning, Reg. What Is Arizona Really Like? Regason Cartoon Books, 1968
7. Opitz, Glen B. Dictionary of American Sculptors: 18th Century to the Present," Illustrated with Over 200 Photographs. Apollo Books, 1984
8. Bender, George A. A History of Arizona Pharmacy. Arizona Pharmacy Historical Foundation, 1985
9. Who's Who in the West 1985-86. Marquis Who's Who, 1985
10. Who's Who in the World 1989-1990. Wilmette, Illinois: Marquis Who's Who Inc., 1988
11. The Red Book Western American Price Index. Southwest Art, 1993
12. Southwest Art. Master Index 1971-1993. Boulder, CO: Southwest Art, 1993
13. Cooper, Evelyn S. Arizona's Hal Empie. His Life, His Times and His Art. Arizona Historical Foundation 2001
14. Art of the West Guidebook of Western Artists, 2001 Edition, Minnetonka, MN: Art of the West, 2001
15. Davenport, Ray. Davenport's Art Reference, The Gold Edition 2005. Phoenix, AZ: LTB Gordonsart, Inc., 2005
16. Dunbier, Lonnie Pierson. The Artist’s Bluebook: 34,000 North American Artists to March 2005.
17. Kinsley, Shaw. Tubac: Images of America. Charleston, South Carolina: Arcadia Publishing, 2009
18. Herbert, Harold E.. Graham County: Images of America. Charleston, South Carolina: Arcadia Publishing, 2009
19. Davis, Neal F.. Meteor Crater: Images of America. Charleston, South Carolina: Arcadia Publishing, 2016
20. O'Bagy Davis, Carolyn. Cameron Trading Post: Images of America. Charleston, South Carolina: Arcadia Publishing, 2016
21. Mark, Jay and Peters, Ronald L.. Buckhorn Mineral Baths and Wildlife Museum: Images of America. Charleston, South Carolina: Arcadia Publishing, 2017
22. Western Art Collector, Jan. 2018, p. 88.
23. Groves, Ann Empie. Way Out West: Hal Empie's Kartoon Kards, The Collection. The Artist's Daughter Publishing, 2019
24. Groves, Ann Empie. How To Paint the Desert by Hal Empie. The Artist's Daughter Publishing, 2025
