= Gerry Peirce =

American artist (1900–1968)

- Born: Gerry Peirce; 1900; Jamestown, New York
- Died: 1968 (aged 67–68); Tucson, Arizona
- Education: Cleveland School of Fine Arts, Art Student’s League, New York
- Known for: Art; Printmaker
- Movement: landscape regionalism

Gerry Peirce (1900–1968) was an American artist who specialized as a watercolorist and printmaker. He is best known for his dry point plate etchings and ethereal watercolors of Arizona desert landscapes, cactus, mountains.

== Life ==
Peirce was born in 1900 in Jamestown, New York. He attended the Cleveland School of Fine Arts, and then completed his education at the Art Student's League in New York City.

After graduating, Peirce married his childhood sweetheart, Pricilla. The young couple gravitated to an isolated fishing village in Nova Scotia for eight months where Peirce established a studio and began producing dry point etchings. The process requires a blank sheet of copper and a sharp needle; every scratch in the copper creates a ridge known as a “burr” which holds the ink. A richness and softness as well as depth of the etching is created by burr but it wears rapidly so only small editions of prints are created, typically less than fifty.

During the depression, the Peirces moved to the French Quarter of New Orleans, where Gerry produced a series of prints depicting the city and teaching at the New Orleans Art School. The couple traveled throughout the US and Cuba, depicting San Antonio, Palm Beach, Havana, Washington D.C., and New York City. Settling in Philadelphia, Peirce established a commercial art studio, producing cards for Cartier and Tiffany & Co. Tiring of commercial work the Peirces headed to Colorado, where he created a series of Mountain etchings. Inspired by the celebrated desert print work of George Albert Burr, that winter they headed south to Arizona, temporarily staying in Phoenix before making their home in Tucson.

== Tucson ==
Peirce established a print atelier in Tucson in 1934. The studio, known as “The Print Room,” was originally located in “Governor’s Corner” at 158 North Court Street, was relocated to Charles O. Brown House in the early 1940s. He called the building the “Old Adobe,” a name that stuck for decades. Arizona transformed his work. Peirce turned to the desert for inspiration, his prints capturing the tonality and stark grandeur of the Sonoran desert. His compositions are infused with solace, dignity, and the ethereal beauty of the west. In 1939, in partnership with his friend and contemporary Stanford Stevens, he illustrated the publication “Plants of Sun and Sand.” His prints gradually gained national recognition. His work is accessioned into the permanent collection of institutions including the Metropolitan Museum of Art, Boston Museum of Fine Art, Cleveland Museum of Art, Library of Congress, the Smithsonian and Harvard's Fogg Museum.

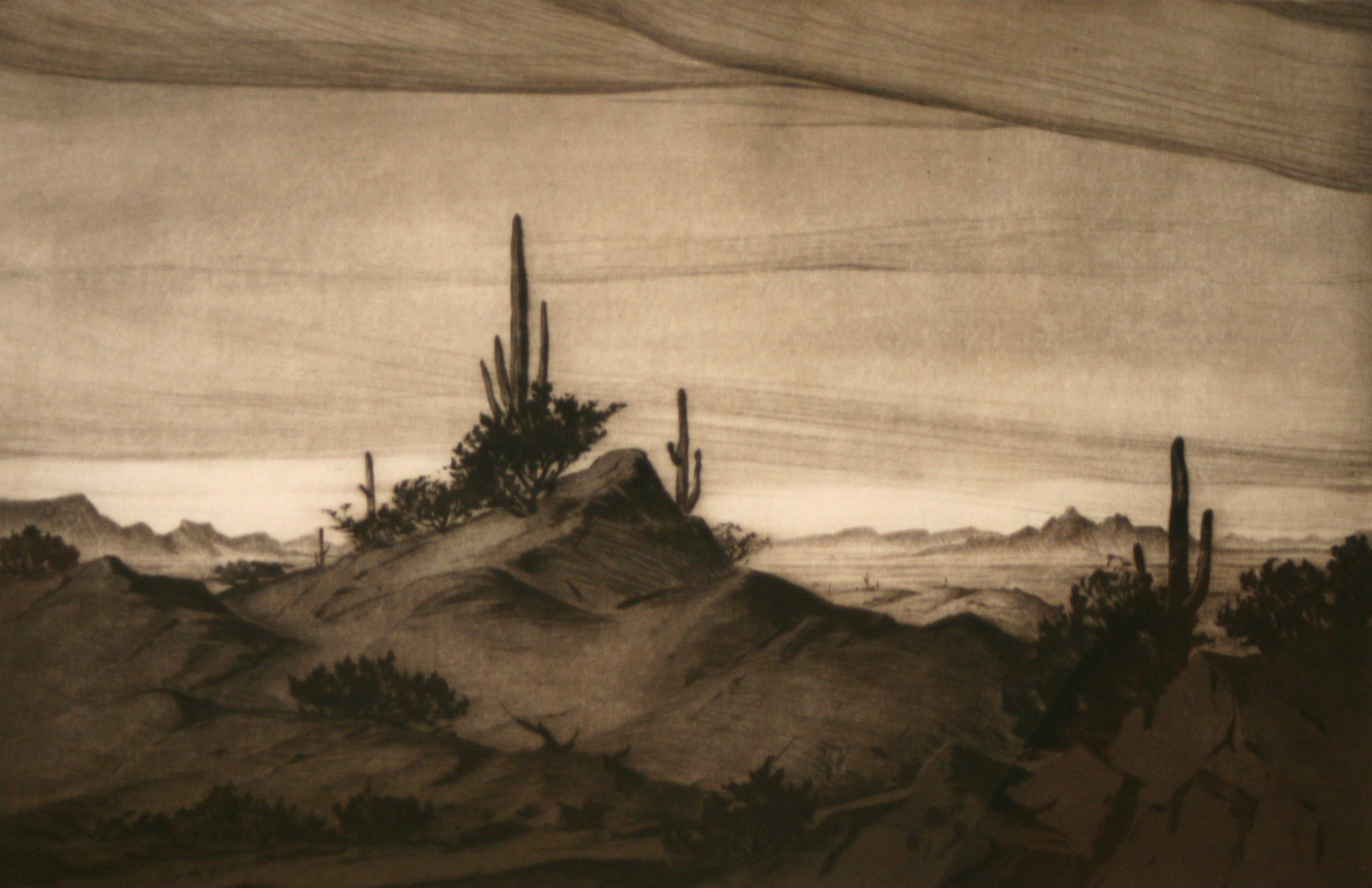
etching by Gerry Peirce

== Watercolor ==
His primary medium remained dry-point etching until a sketching trip with Stevens. Peirce reminisced in an article: “One Day I was looking at a scene Stan was doing and wondered why he ad picked out that particular spot. Why paint that I asked. His reply, “Because it has such a beautiful color.” jolted me right out of everything I'd been doing for the past twelve years. I realized that I was no longer seeing a landscape with its colors, but in terms of the black and white of etchings. I saw that even my etchings were becoming flat no longer suggesting the color of things.” Peirce picked up a brush and watercolors and began capturing his surroundings in layers of color.

== Gerry Peirce School of Art ==
Following World War II an interest in fine art and the enthusiasm surrounding Peirce’s work and classes he began teaching came to an apex. In 1949 the Tucson Watercolor Guild was organized at the home of Margaret Sanger with a mission foster, promote and encourage creative artistic activates in the Southwest. The guild built school and community studio and Peirce the primary instructor.

The 5 acre tract of land at the corner of Swan and 22nd Street was donated by future Arizona governor Sam Goddard; architect Emerson Scholer contributed his service. Painter L.B. Curtis designed the landscape, and Leionne Salter of the Arizona Studio developed the interior design. The labor was provided mostly by Peirce’s students.

== Legacy ==
A generation of Tucson artists passed through the doors of the school. Peirce continued to prolifically produce both his extraordinary etchings and watercolors. Peirce authored the book “Painting in the Southwest Landscape in Watercolor” and was awarded an honorary doctor of philosophy in arts from St. Andrews University College of London. Peirce died in Tucson at the age of 68. For over thirty years his work help shape national views of the region and desert and his though his establishment of meaningful cultural institutions influenced the cultural milieu of the city helping to make it artistic center of Arizona.

== Artwork ==
Gerry Peirce was an artist who worked primarily in dry point etching and watercolor.

== Bibliography ==
- Sonnichsen, C.L., Tucson, The Life and Time of an American City, 1987.
- American Artist, Volume 22, Page 120, 1969.
- Arizona Highways Magazine, Garry Peirce, Volume 21, 1945.
- Federal Writers’ Project, WPA Guide to Louisiana: The Pelican State, 2013.
- Stevens, Stanford, Plants of Sun and Sand: The Desert Growth of Arizona, 1939.
