= Sophie and Harwood Steiger =

American textile artists

Harwood and Sophie Steiger
- Known for: Textiles; Graphic design
- Movement: Modernism

Harwood Steiger (1900–1980) and Sophie Steiger (unknown–1980) were American textile artists and printmakers. They are best known for their desert textile art of the 20th century.

== Life ==
During the 1950s, 1960, and 1970s Steiger was name associated with Southern Arizona fabric design. Together Harwood and Sophie Steiger would run the Tubac Steiger studio producing extraordinary silkscreen fabric design that would become synonymous with the Southern Arizona style in the post World War II era.

== Harwood Steiger ==
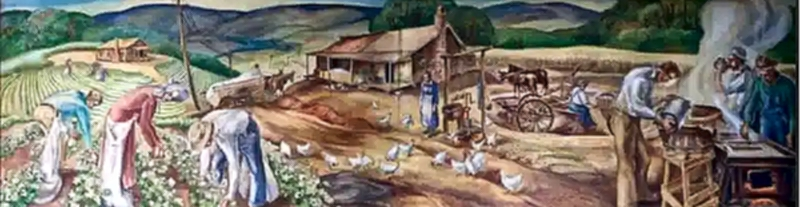
Harvest at Fort Payne (1938), Harwood Steiger's mural for the post office at Fort Payne, Alabama

Harwood Steiger was born in 1900 in Fairport, New York. He studied painting at the Rochester Institute of Technology and took his first job as a colorist in a dye plant. That job would affect his later work in life. He then enrolled in the Pennsylvania Academy of Fine Arts, taking every course they had to offer.

After moving to New York City in the 1920s to make a name for himself, Harwood was swept into the depression, like the rest of the country. Undaunted, the entrepreneurial young man opened his own art studio and began teaching classes.

In the early 1930s, Harwood’s work was gaining acclaim. Continuing to teach, he opened a summer art school at Martha’s Vineyard called The Steiger Paint Group. His artistic style drew on the social mores and themes of the era. Like Thomas Hart Benton, who also summered on Marta’s Vineyard, Harwood’s artistic style was on the forefront of the Regionalist art movement. He worked primarily in watercolor, sculpting his fluid figures in thick washes of color, using sharp dark lines to give his work a punctuating weight. His art explored the everyday experiences of ordinary people, a stylistic choice associated with the New Deal art projects. In 1938, Harwood received a commission from the Section of Painting and Sculpture and completed a mural for the post office in Fort Payne, Alabama. In 2001 the mural was relocated to Hunt Hall, part of the Fort Payne Hosiery Museum.

== Sophie Steiger ==
Harwood’s Martha’s Vineyard summer studio drew students from all over the country, including an attractive young schoolteacher named Sophie, an artist in her own right. She came from the country, with an artistic curiosity about botanicals and herbs. Her art reflected this interest – plants and flowers were a central theme of her painting, utilizing watercolor to create delicate washes of tone and depth. The couple married. Addendum : Sophie Steiger was born Sophie Halbwachs in Brooklyn, New York. Her parents were from Alsace-Lorraine. The Father was a non-commissioned officer in the U.S. Army.

== Tubac, Arizona ==
In 1956, after a trip through northern Mexico, the Steigers fell in love with Arizona, and built a home and studio in Tubac, a small village 45 miles south of Tucson. The climate, history, and landscape reshaped their artistic interests. They also developed an interest in the technique of silkscreen, and fabric design.

== Fabric printing ==
The couple worked closely in the design, development, and production. Their fabrics were a hit, earning national and international attention.

Harwood would draw a design, and Sophie would decide if the work should be transferred to fabric, choosing the type of fabric and its base color. Harwood chose the silkscreen dye and would cut the designs into lacquer films. The stencils were placed on the silk screens and the dye brushed though the screens, a separate film and screen for each color.

The new fabric design was a departure from Harwood’s earlier work but retained a familiar graphic sensibility. These new functional works reflected both Harwood and Sophies’s artistic interests – dozens of fabrics were decorative abstractions of botanical themes, others ruminations on desert animals and cactus.

The couple produced 36 yards of fabric at a time, repeating the silkscreen process over and over down their long studio table.

== Legacy ==
Over three decades, through hundreds of fabric designs, the Steigers created a vocabulary of graphic fabric patterning that became part of southern Arizona style. Their work offered a functional modernist interpretation of the Southwest. Although the studio closed in the 1980s after Sophie’s death, their influence is still present, not just in the tablecloths, curtains, dresses, and upholstery that sprinkle the interiors of houses throughout Tucson, but in a rich sophisticated style that continues to express the vision of post World War II southern Arizona. The Steiger silkscreens are now part of the permanent collections of Pima Community College in Tucson, Arizona and the American Textile History Museum in Lowell, Massachusetts.

== Artwork ==
The Steigers were designers who worked primarily in painting and textiles.

== Bibliography ==
- Tucson Daily Citizen, Harwood Steiger Tucson Daily Citizen Art Prizes Awards, Feb 4, 1961
- Harwood Steiger, Tucson Daily Citizen, Festival Time at Tubac, Page 12 January 32, 1965
- Arizona Highways Magazine, Harwood Steiger, Volume 42, 1966
- Beeaff, Dianne Ebertt, The Southwestern Rhythms of Harwood Steiger Fabrics, Fiber Arts, April 1986.
- Green Valley News, Color and Originality a Specialty, November 30, 1967.

== See also ==
- Fiber art
