= Isabella Greenway =

American politician (1886–1953)

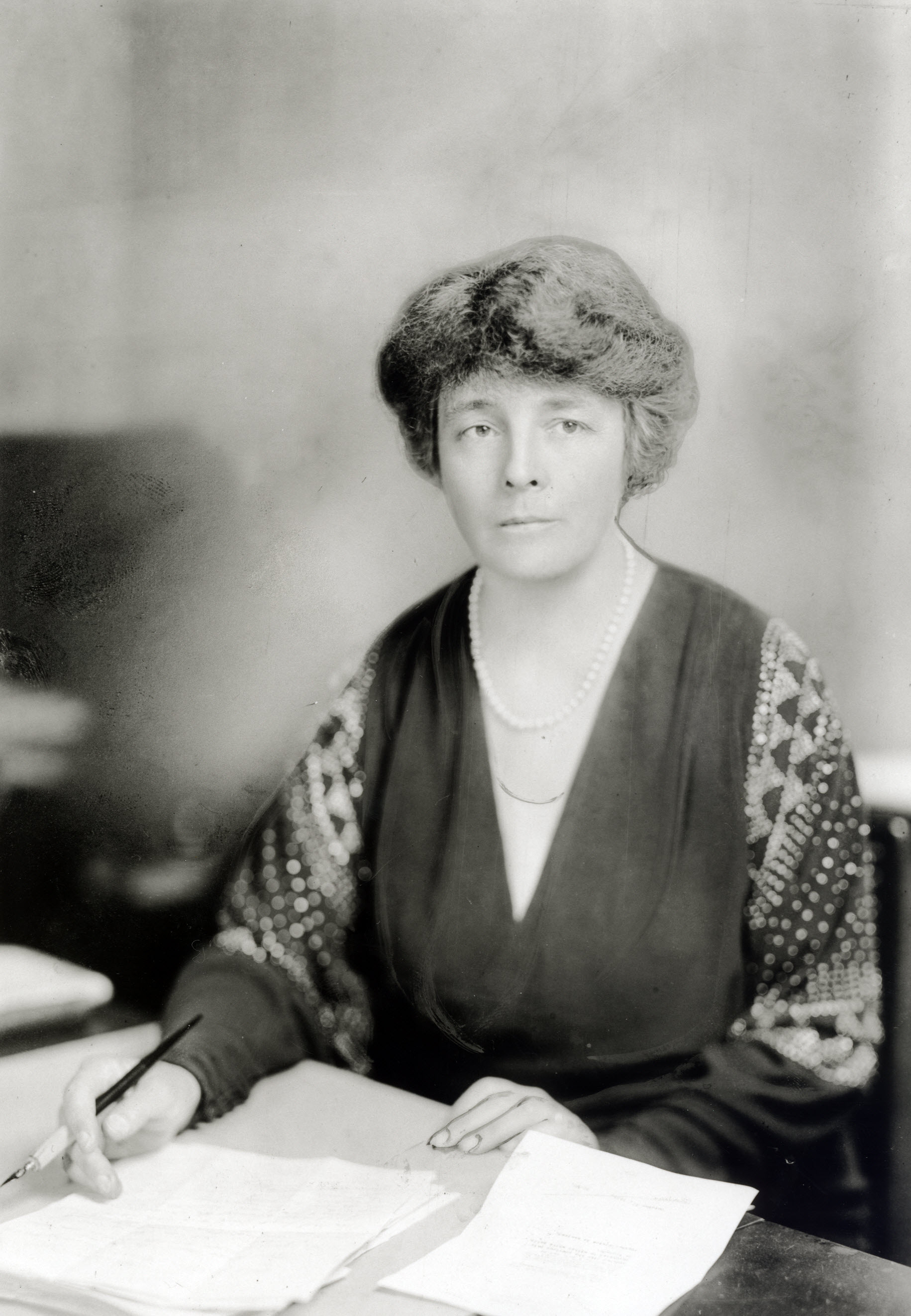
- Greenway in the 1930s

Member of the U.S. House of Representatives from Arizona's at-large district
- In office October 3, 1933 – January 3, 1937
- Preceded by: Lewis Williams Douglas
- Succeeded by: John R. Murdock

Personal details
- Born: Isabella Dinsmore Selmes; March 22, 1886 Boone County, Kentucky, U.S.
- Died: December 18, 1953 (aged 67) Tucson, Arizona, U.S.
- Resting place: Dinsmore homestead in Kentucky
- Party: Democratic
- Spouses: Robert Munro-Ferguson (m. 1905; died 1922); John Campbell Greenway (died 1926); Harry O. King (m. 1939)

Isabella Dinsmore Greenway (née Selmes; born March 22, 1886 – December 18, 1953) was an American politician who was the first congresswoman in Arizona history, and the founder of the Arizona Inn of Tucson. During her life she was also noted as a one-time owner and operator of Los Angeles-based Gilpin Airlines, a speaker at the 1932 Democratic National Convention, and a bridesmaid at the wedding of Eleanor and Franklin D. Roosevelt.

== Early life ==
Isabella Dinsmore Selmes was born the daughter of Tilden Russell Selmes (1853–1895) and Martha "Patty" Macomb Flandrau (1861–1923). Isabella was born at the historic Dinsmore Farm in Boone County, Kentucky which was owned by her mother's maternal great aunt Julia Stockton Dinsmore (1833–1926). Her father Tilden Selmes was a Yale-educated attorney who originally practiced in St. Paul where he met her mother. Her mother Martha "Patty" Flandrau was the daughter of Minnesota Supreme Court judge and politician Charles Eugene Flandrau (1828–1903) and his first wife Isabella Ramsay Dinsmore (1830–1867).

The Selmes family owned a ranch 15 miles west of Mandan in Dakota Territory and was on the same rail line as Theodore Roosevelt's ranches in Medora, 150 miles west of town. Her father Tilden and Theodore met in St. Paul while both were waiting their west-bound train. The Selmes family hosted him multiple times at their ranch and developed a close friendship with each other. The ranch was lost in blizzards in 1886–87, and Tilden, Patty and little Isabella moved to St. Paul to be near Patty's family. Tilden continued to practice law, and was for a time an associate counsel for the Northern Pacific Railroad.

After the untimely death of her father in 1895, Isabella and her mother lived with various members of her mother's family in Kentucky, Minnesota, and New York. Patty supported them by selling bacon and ham and working as a chaperone. In 1901, Patty's sister and brother-in-law, Sarah and Franklin Cutcheon, invited Patty and Isabella to join them in New York City. Isabella attended Miss Chapin's School and Miss Spence's School in New York City, where she met and became lifelong friends with Roosevelt's niece, Eleanor. Isabella finished school in 1904, but did not graduate.

As Patty had a drinking problem, and with a smaller inheritance from Flandrau than expected, Isabella's debut was seen by the family as a way to not only secure her future but also "keep her mother from succumbing to drink and despair." Isabella was successful in society. She became friends with Eleanor Roosevelt's cousin, Corinne Robinson, who would read a Jack London book to Isabella as they drove to balls to make sure they remembered the world's problems.

== First and second marriages ==
During her debutante season, Isabella met Robert Munro-Ferguson (1867–1922), the younger brother of Ronald Munro-Furguson (1860–1934). Robert was a family friend of the Roosevelts, as well as one of Theodore Roosevelt's Rough Riders.

In 1905, Isabella was one of Eleanor's bridesmaids when Eleanor Roosevelt married Franklin Delano Roosevelt. Shortly thereafter, while the Roosevelts were on their honeymoon, Isabella married Robert in a small ceremony. They honeymooned in Scotland, where they met with the Roosevelts. Robert and Isabella became the godparents of Franklin and Eleanor's only daughter, Anna Eleanor Roosevelt.

The Fergusons had two children, Martha (1906) and Robert Jr. (1908). Theodore Roosevelt became Robert Jr.'s godfather.

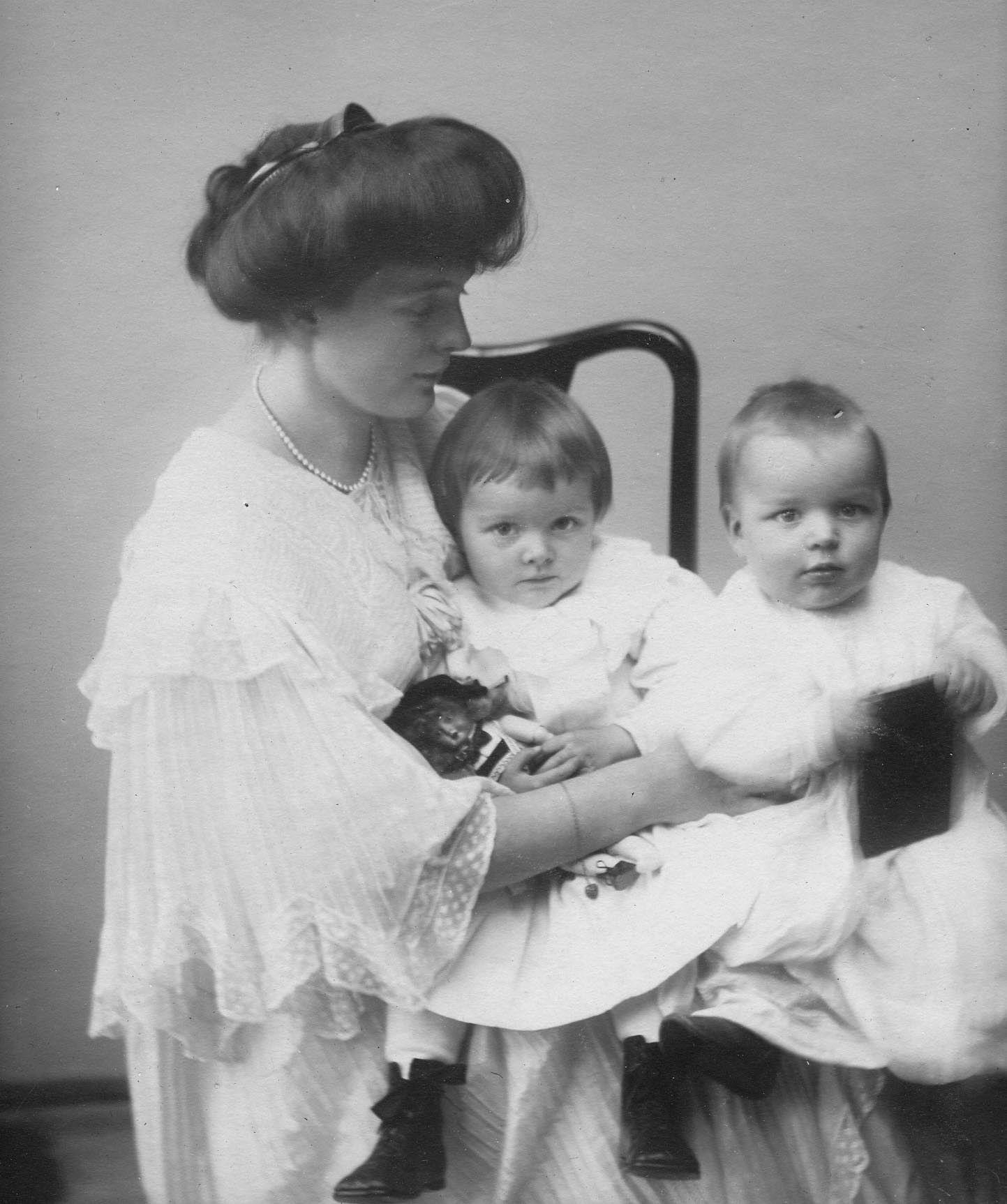
Isabella Ferguson with Martha and Robert Jr. in 1909

Three years into the marriage, Robert contracted tuberculosis. Isabella joined him as he went to a sanatorium in upstate New York. In 1910 the couple moved to the dry climate of New Mexico, hoping his health would improve. There Isabella, with help from her mother, nursed her husband, educated their two children, and managed the ranch. This would have been especially difficult, as at the time, tuberculosis patients were told to have their own utensils and bedding and avoid touching others. The couple "homesteaded", building a large house with a pool and gardens. During this period, Isabella and Eleanor established a close correspondence that continued for the rest of their lives. In 1921, Robert's health declined. The Ferguson family moved to Santa Barbara, California, so the children could go to school. Robert died on October 3, 1922.

In 1923, Isabella married a close friend, Gen. John Campbell Greenway (1872–1926), another of Roosevelt's Rough Riders, whom she had met in 1911. Ferguson had encouraged Isabella to visit Greenway in Bisbee, Arizona as a respite from her many responsibilities. Although the visits were chaperoned, John fell in love with Isabella. As was appropriate at the time, Greenway confessed these feelings to Ferguson and offered to leave the country. However, Ferguson just asked that the two not be alone together. Isabella continued to write to Greenway, with her husband's knowledge, through his service in Europe during World War I.

John moved the family to a ranch near Bisbee where he was manager of the Calumet and Arizona Mining Company. Later the family moved to Ajo where Isabella and John's son, John Selmes ("Jack") Greenway (1924–1995) was born. In 1926, John died suddenly following surgery, leaving Isabella a widow once again. Isabella continued many of her husband's plans in his memory. She successfully campaigned for a statue of John Campbell Greenway to be placed in the United States Capitol Building and facilitated its creation.

Isabella and her children moved to Williams, Arizona, and bought the Quarter Circle Double X Ranch as she and John had planned. Through smart business dealings and the sale of her mining stock at the top of its value ahead of the 1929 stock market crash, Isabella was able to grow the ranch to over 130,000 acres (530 km^{2}). During the same period, she also became the owner and operator of Los Angeles-based Gilpin Airlines. In 1930, Greenway founded the Arizona Inn in Tucson.

== Activism and politics ==
=== Early work ===
Her political work began in 1912, when Isabella worked to get voters for Roosevelt's Bull Moose ticket. Ferguson told her to campaign and register voters in "the most shameless manner."

During the First World War she developed and directed the New Mexico Women's Land Army, a network of southwest women who farmed while the men were overseas. She also served on the local National Defense Council.

After the war, Isabella Ferguson joined the Grant County Board of Education. She temporarily closed the schools to incentivize citizens into paying their school taxes.

In 1927, Greenway opened Arizona Hut, a furniture factory employing disabled veterans and their immediate families. She also lobbied for a dam on the Colorado River.

Before John Greenway's death, he had been on the start of a career in government. He had been asked to run for governor and received a nomination for vice president at the 1924 Democratic National Convention. Greenway met industrialists and veterans' groups through John. These groups later supported her political career.

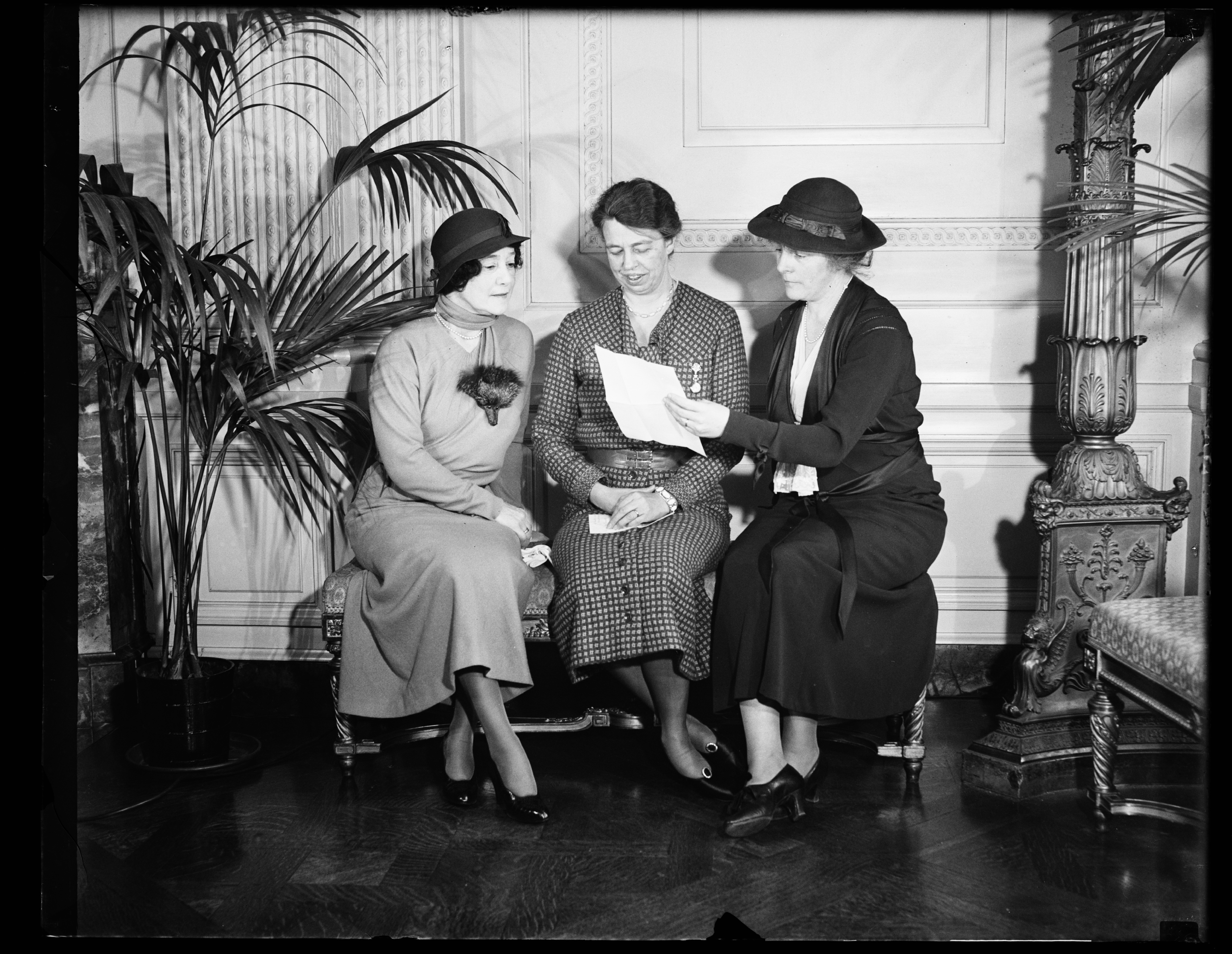
1934 photograph of Mary Harriman Rumsey, Chairman of the Consumers Advisory Board of the N.R.A; Eleanor Roosevelt; and Rep. Isabella Greenway.

=== Arizona's Democratic national committeewoman ===
In 1928, Greenway became Arizona's Democratic national committeewoman. Although she was urged to run for governor, she decided not to. She expanded the committeewoman position's responsibilities, campaigning for Al Smith. Although Smith lost, Governor George W. P. Hunt said of Greenway ""No other woman in Arizona did as much for the success of the party."

As Arizona's Democratic national committeewoman, Greenway also reorganized the Democratic Party so the men's and women's divisions were integrated. She also promoted women in the Democratic party, leading several to appointments and elections of women to state legislature vacancies and election.

In 1930, Greenway was urged again to run for governor. However, as the mother of a young son, she wanted to prioritize him and was uncertain that women would vote for a mother of a young child.

Greenway continued to work with Hunt. He appointed Greenway to a commission planning Arizona's exhibit at the Century of Progress exposition. He also asked her to consult with copper miners when they were impacted by the depression.

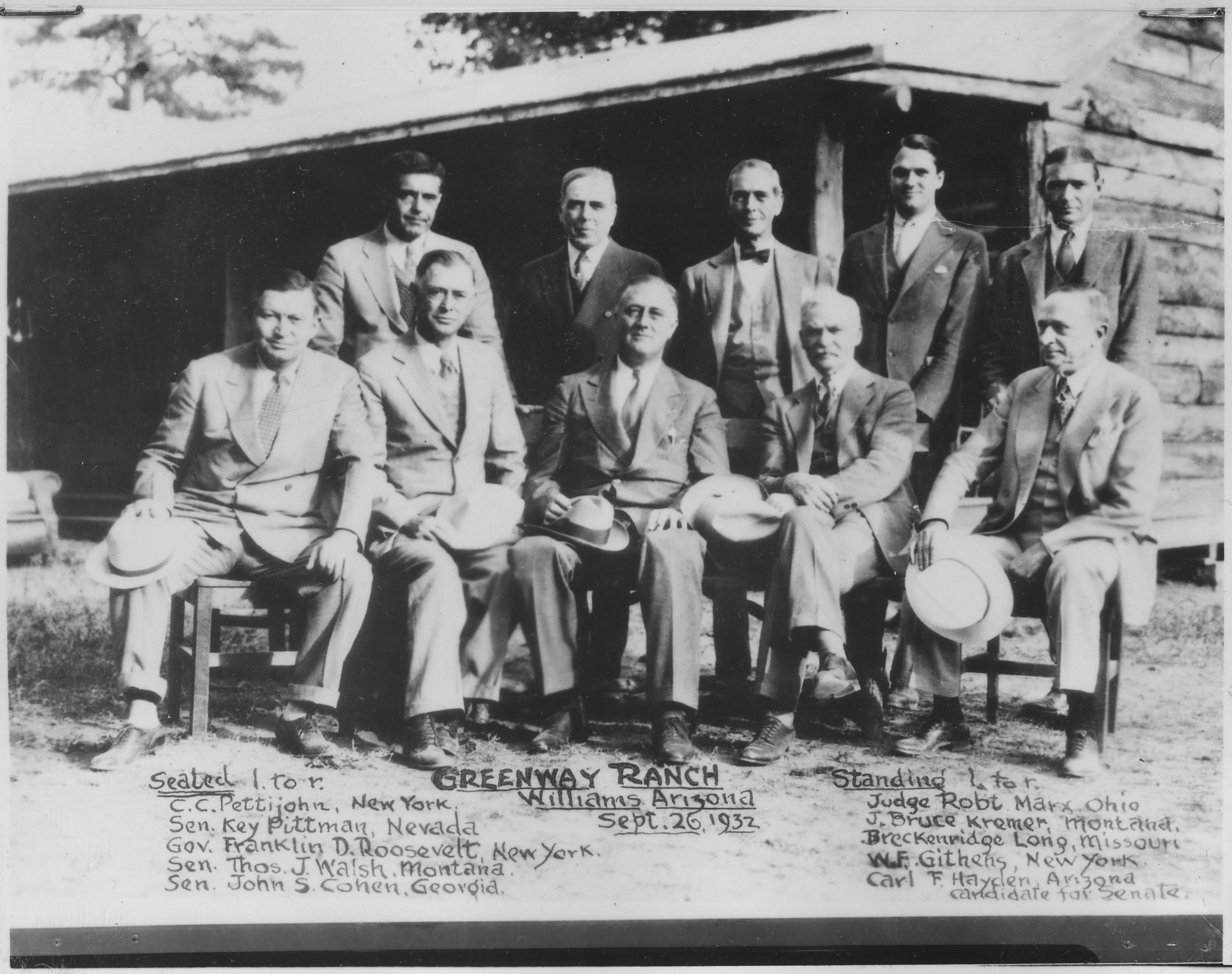
Franklin D. Roosevelt in center at the Quarter Circle Double X Ranch (1932)

In 1932, Greenway campaigned heavily for Franklin Roosevelt and was credited with assuring his support from Arizona. She made one of the speeches seconding his nomination at the 1932 Democratic National Convention. When the nomination process stalled at the end of the third ballot, Greenway convinced the California delegation to meet with Roosevelt's campaign director, Jim Farley. Farley's promise that John Nance Garner would be Roosevelt's vice president convinced California to support Roosevelt, securing him the nomination. Arizona's delegation honored Greenway with an honorary nomination for vice president. Greenway continued to campaign for Roosevelt in Arizona, even hosting him at her ranch during his tour of western states. Greenways served as Arizona's official representative at Roosevelt's inauguration.

Greenway resigned as national committeewoman on February 8, 1933.

=== Congressional career ===
In 1933, Rep. Lewis W. Douglas resigned as the Representative to the 73rd Congress when he was appointed the U.S. director of the budget. Greenway ran in the special election for his seat. She was strongly supported by veterans. When Congress gave Roosevelt the power to cut many expenditures, including veterans' benefits, Greenway urged Roosevelt to research the impact of a possible loss of benefits on Arizona. This showed her commitment to veterans' programs and her access to the president. Greenway's platform included support of a copper tariff, farm relief (though she called it "agricultural equality"), and countering anti-female bias. Greenway travelled by plane from town to town to campaign. She won in a landslide, with 70 percent of the vote, and was sworn in on January 3, 1934.

As a congresswoman, Greenway had many responsibilities. She was appointed to the Indian Affairs Committee and the Public Lands Committee. Both of these were particularly relevant in Arizona due to the proposed Taylor Grazing Act of 1934, the Indian Reorganization Act, and the large amount of government land and Indian reservations in Arizona. She also continued to work to revive Arizona's copper mining industry and support veteran's benefits. She also supported work relief programs. Much of her time was spent addressing constituent concerns. Greenway declined a dinner invitation for her birthday, claiming that work kept her working through the night.

Greenway ran for reelection in 1934. Her campaign faced controversy when $4 million earmarked for the Verde River Irrigation Project was rescinded, leading homesteaders to hang and burn effigies of Greenway, Harold L. Ickes, and Benjamin Baker Moeur. Greenway still was re-elected by over 33,000 votes.

Though Greenway broadly supported New Deal legislation during her terms in Congress, she demonstrated her political independence by breaking with the President over some issues of concern to veterans, an important part of her political base in Arizona. She opposed legislation to reduce the pensions of World War I servicemen, funds for which FDR planned to shift to fund economic recovery programs. She also opposed some provisions of the 1935 Social Security Act, which she believed would be impossible to implement in the long term.

On her fiftieth birthday she announced that she was retiring from public office. There was some expectation that had she run in the 1936 election, she would have been unopposed in both the primary and general elections. She claimed that Arizona was in a better situation, as the mines and farms were improving, and noting she wanted to spend more time with family. Some observers guessed that she chose to retire due to her conflicts with Roosevelt. Her son Jack later explained that her retirement was due to her being worn out from being Arizona's sole representative.

== Later life ==
While working as a congresswoman, Greenway met Harry O. King (1890–1976), a National Recovery Administration manager for the copper industry. After her retirement, King divorced his wife of twenty-two years and began courting Greenway. They married in 1939. By then, King was president of the Institute of Applied Economics in New York City. During their marriage, Isabella spent part of her time in New York City and part in Tucson.

In 1940, Greenway refused to support Roosevelt for another term, as she believed there should be a limit of two presidential terms. She worked with the Democrats supporting Wendell Willkie. In response to her disloyalty, Roosevelt invited Greenway's children, without their mother, to dinner at the White House. However, Greenway remained close with Eleanor.

Although Greenway had opposed the United States entering the war in Europe, after Pearl Harbor, she joined the war effort. She was elected to chair the American Women's Voluntary Services and the Arizona Inn was deemed essential to the war efforts in order to provide accommodations near the local air base and naval training schools.

== Death and legacy ==
Greenway died in 1953 in Tucson at the Arizona Inn of heart failure. She is buried on the Dinsmore Homestead in Kentucky where she had been born.

In Phoenix, Greenway Road and several public schools are named for her second husband, John Campbell Greenway.

In 1981, Greenway was posthumously inducted into the Arizona Women's Hall of Fame as a member of the inaugural cohort.

== See also ==
- Women in the United States House of Representatives

== Other sources ==
- "Isabella Selmes Greenway" in Women in Congress, 1917–1990. Prepared under the direction of the Commission on the Bicentenary by the Office of the Historian, U.S. House of Representatives. Washington: Government Printing Office, 1991.
- "Isabella Greenway King" in the magazine series Arizona Pioneers, in Copper State Journal, Fall 1997. Compiled and edited by Floyd R. Negley.
- Beasley, Maurine H. et al., The Eleanor Roosevelt Encyclopedia, pp. 217–218
- Miller, Kristie (2004). Isabella Greenway: An Enterprising Woman. Tucson, Ariz.: University of Arizona Press. ISBN 0-8165-1897-1.
- Miller, Kristie; McGinnis, Robert H., eds. (2009). A Volume of Friendship: The Letters of Eleanor Roosevelt and Isabella Greenway, 1904–1953. Tucson, Arizona: Arizona Historical Society. ISBN 978-0-910037-50-1.

U.S. House of Representatives
Preceded by Lewis Douglas	Member of the U.S. House of Representatives from Arizona's at-large congressional district 1933–1937	Succeeded by John R. Murdock
