= Ross Stefan =

American painter

- Born: June 13, 1934; Milwaukee, Wisconsin
- Died: January 10, 1999 (aged 64); Tucson, Arizona
- Education: University of Arizona
- Occupation: Artist

Ross Stefan (June 13, 1934 – January 10, 1999) was an American artist known for his paintings, drawings, and pastels focusing on the iconography and imagery of the American West.

Stefan obtained national recognition as an accomplished young artist, After graduating college he established a studio in Tubac, Arizona in 1955. In 1971 Stefan held a sold-out solo exhibition at New York City's Grand Central Art Galleries which propelled him into national fame. His work was recognized with numerous retrospective exhibitions including the Phippen Museum, Denver Art Museum, Pierce Western Collection, Phoenix Art Museum, Harmsen Collection, and the Sangre de Cristo Arts Center. His work is in the permanent collections of major museums in the American West including the Desert Caballeros Western Museum, Phoenix Art Museum, Tucson Museum of Art, Woolaroc Museum, and Wright Museum of Art.

== Early years, 1934–1955 ==
Ross L. Stefan was born in Milwaukee, Wisconsin on June 13, 1934, to mother Ivah, and father Edward J. Stefan.

In the summer of 1948 he was awarded first prize in an art contest sponsored by the Milwaukee Journal. Stefan was enamored with the American West and with his father made a two-week trip to the Seven Dash guest ranch at Dragoon, Arizona an hour east of Tucson. The Arizona Daily Star featured the first of many profiles on the young artist on February 1, 1948. Noting that, "Western theme is favorite of 13-year-Old Ross Stefan."

Returning home to Wisconsin, Stefan began experimenting with oil paints. He was a winner of a Wisconsin calendar illustration contest but that year he developed severe respiratory health issues which landed him in the hospital. Needing a warmer climate and inspired by Southern Arizona landscapes his family moved to Tucson, Arizona.

Stefan reflected in 1950, "I was a sickly child and was forced to spend much time in bed. I had to amuse myself and chose painting as the best way. Probably the comic books, western stories, and the western movies have exerted more influence on my work than anything else ... I’d been wanting them to move ever since I can remember. Both my mother and I needed a better climate, but as far as I’m concerned there’s just no place else to live."

In Tucson the family lived at 3237 East Bellevue and 543 East Mabel. He enrolled at Catalina junior high school and continued his art. He sold handmade comic books to fellow students for a dime apiece. His first licensing deal was a greeting card series of reproductions of pastels published nationally and he began working on a book with reproductions of his paintings.

In January 1949 Tucson's Porter's Department Store hosted the first exhibition of Stefans's work. During this period the young Stefan began public demonstrations of his ability and he donated one of his paintings, "It’s a Boy", to the YMCA for installation in the lobby of their new building. The painting was produced when he was 13 and entered into the Milwaukee Journal's state-wide high school contest of 2000 entries and was reproduced in color by the paper over the May and June 1949 newspaper calendar.

He also presented work at an exhibition at the El Dorado Ranch. A teacher submitted a sketch to the Milton Bradley "American the Beautiful" contest and the drawing took first place. In February 1950 his painting "Rodeo Time" was displayed in the window of Dave Bloom and Sons, on Congress Street in downtown Tucson and in June 1950, Stefan was featured in Seventeen Magazine.

In September 1950 he exhibited prints as part of the Tucson Chamber of Commerce, Tucson Craftsman's Guild, and Tucson Chapter of American Artist’ Professional League, "Made in Tucson" exhibition. A group of his paintings was sent for a private display in Beverly Hills. He noted at the time, "The pictures do all the traveling while I stay home and go to Tucson high."

In October 1950 Stefan forged an important relationship that would significantly raise his profile in Arizona. The president of the Bank of Douglas was impressed with his art and invited him to exhibit at the inaugural exhibition at the Bank of Douglas when it opened its branch in downtown Tucson. The exhibit was so popular it was extended and shipped to the Phoenix branch of the Bank and became an annual event each year showcasing the new work of the prodigy artist. This platform and exposure annually resulted in new coverage, and as Stefan's style continued to mature the exhibitions began to sell out.

That same month he showed at the famous Arizona department store Goldwaters' in Phoenix alongside noted Arizona artists including Hutton Webster Jr. and Leionne Salter and he exhibited at the National bank of El Paso Texas during the city's centennial.

In 1951 the Chamber of Commerce organized a solo exhibition in Tucson fifteen pastel works that then traveled to area guest ranches including Rancho del Rio, Desert Willow and El Dorado. with the proceeds benefiting the Cerebral Palsy Foundation. His work Sire Smoku Gold of Brookfield:” was selected for the annual Independent Open show of the Tucson Fine Arts Association and featured in the Tucson Citizen. winning first prize at the exhibit. That month he again showed with the Phoenix and Tucson members of the American Artist Professional Legal at the Fiske Art Center Gallery.

His painting of San Xavier del Bac was selected as the art for a 1952 Christmas Card by a midwestern publishing house. He licensed the image and it was reproduction on 2 million holiday cards. His painting "Apache Smoke" a character study was exhibited as part of a group show by the Magazine Tucson at the Country Club Plaza. In May his painting of the Bird Cage Theatre was shown at the Epitaph Office in Tombstone, Arizona.

In June 1952 Stefan penned an article in the Tucson Citizen titled, "Young Painter Favors Realism, Not Abstracts." He wrote "I like to be realistic in my portrayals because I am fond of the life the way the man on the street sees it. I don’t like distortion of any kind – there is enough o that in the world today." In October he exhibited in the Tucson Fine Arts Association Open Show and was awarded third place for his painting Chemihuevl Basket Maker. In November his sketches first appeared in the Arizona Daily Star.

In January 1953 Bank of Douglas showed his 13 works of art in the sixth annual exhibit of his work. and the show was sold out. He served as art editor of the Tucson high school magazine. The Bank of Douglas presented 15 of the paintings at the phoenix main office in March. He showed in the Junior Red Cross International Art Show at the Tucson Fine Arts gallery.

In 1953 as Stefan prepared to graduate from high school he was awarded a scholarship to attend the Layton art School in Milwaukee Wisconsin. but chose to stay in Tucson and attend the University of Arizona. In the fall of 1953 Stefan was hired to paint murals on the walls of a new restaurant "Saddle and Sirloin stake house" at 2130 North Oracle Road. In 1955 at the age of 19, he was again profiled in a feature article in Seventeen Magazine. During this period he became an illustrator for the Tucson newspaper the Arizona Daily Star.

Bank of Douglas opened a new main branch in Downtown Tucson in May 1955 and continued their exclusive partnership with Stefan presenting his work in a special exhibit as part of the opening celebrations.

At the University of Arizona, he met his wife-to-be Anne Silverson and they married on July 22, 1955, in a ceremony in Minneapolis, Minnesota.

At the age of 21 Stefan opened a gallery in the art colony village of Tubac, Arizona 38 miles south of Tucson. Devoting himself full time to painting, he said at the time, "now I’m giving all my time to my work." in an old adobe building that had been the studio of celebrated American Painter Dale Nicholes.

== Death and legacy ==
Stefan was diagnosed with terminal cancer in the fall of 1997 and continued to paint for a year. He died on January 10, 1999, at the age of 64 in Tucson.

Philanthropist, and western Art collector, Jack Goodman, wrote the book "Ross Stefan: An Impressionistic Painter of the Contemporary Southwest which was published in 1977.

His work has continued to be sought after by collectors and is part of the permanent collections of numerous museums in the American Southwest.
