= Jack Maul =

Arizona artist and writer (1918–1998)

- Born: Jack Maul; 1918; Burbank California
- Died: 1998 (aged 79–80); Nogales, Arizona
- Education: Otis Art Institute, University of Arizona and Cornell University School of Architecture
- Known for: Art; Design
- Movement: Abstract Expressionism, nonrepresentational, representational and Architecture

John C. Maul (1918–1998) was an artist, writer and architectural designer whose work contributed to the “early modern” period of art in Tucson, Arizona. He was called by University of Arizona scholar and professor Maurice Grossman “one of the great artist of his time in this area.” His art was seen as hyper progressive and known for continual experimentation of form and ideas. Maul was known for his abstract and nonrepresentational work.

== Life ==
Maul born in Burbank, California, raised in Hermosillo, Mexico, and grew up in the border town of Nogales, Arizona, where he graduated from High School. Following high school he moved to Tucson at matriculated at the University of Arizona as an engineering student. Maul transferred to the Otis Art Institute where he studied drawing and design for two years before returning to the Unicity of Arizona to studying under art professor James P. Scott. Maul received a fine arts degree in 1946. Maul also attended Cornell University School of Architecture.

During World War II Maul served in the Army language school in the Russian section. Maul lived in the historic Fort Lowell district, was an art critic for the Tucson Daily Citizen in the 1950s and was instrumental in the development of “Ash Alley,” a small downtown back street that burst with art galleries and life during the 1950s.

== Art ==
Throughout the 1940s, 50s and 60s Maul showed extensively in local galleries and museums throughout the region.

In 1948 Maul exhibited at Lloyd Clark Studio Gallery located at 259 North Church Street showing watercolors and line drawings. and that year developed the costume design for Modern Dance performance directed by Genevieve Brown Wright.

Maul was part of the important modernist exhibit “Tucson Independent Artist Group” show and was awarded “Exhibitor’s Choice in watercolor for the painting “Winter Street No. Three”. Throughout the late 1940s his work was exhibited throughout Tucson, and represented by the 261 Gallery and graced the walls of the lobby of the architecturally significant Tucson Biltmore Hotel designed by Arthur Brown.

In 1950 he was given his second one-man show at the 261 Gallery and the work was shown in a one-man show at the Museum of Art in Santa Barbara, California.

His work received numerous awards and was lauded by critics and contemporaries Harrison Moore, a contemporary artist wrote “as impression of change and liveliness… shows how powerfully there runs between the picture a current of the personality...He is an innovator and an heir, consciously and unconsciously on a treasure made up by the exacting tradition of modern art. The technical sensitivity of these pictures and the naturalness of that sensitivity makes one aware of an artistic and workmanlike conscience. Here painting like music becomes its own content, possessing it, giving it life and meaning. His pictures are not pictures of anything they are projections of our world”

Maul worked for local architects and contractors and as a consultant to homeowners and lectured through the Tucson Art Center on the topic of “Architecture for Southwestern Homes.” During the 1980s he showed with the Kay Bonfoey Gallery.

Maul was included in the 1998 retrospective University of Arizona Museum of Art Show: “Early Tucson Moderns”

Maul spent the last twenty years of his life in Nogales, Arizona, dying there in 1998.
