= Arizona Inn =

- U.S. National Register of Historic Places
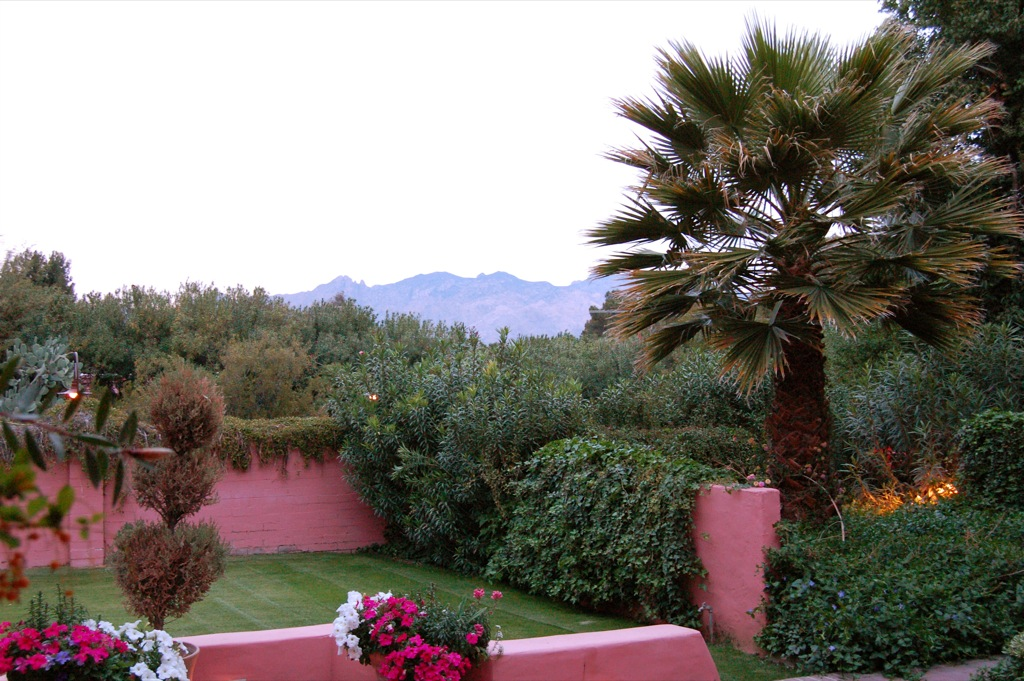
- Arizona Inn garden

- Location within Arizona Location within the United States
- Location: 2200 E. Elm St., Tucson, Arizona
- Coordinates: 32°14′31″N 110°56′19″W
- Area: 6 acres (2.4 ha)
- Built: 1928
- Architect: Merritt Starkweather; James Oliphant
- Architectural style: Late 19th And 20th Century Revivals, Mission/spanish Revival, Mediterranean Revival
- NRHP reference No.: 88000240
- Added to NRHP: April 5, 1988

The Arizona Inn is a hotel in Tucson, Arizona. It was built in 1930–31 by Isabella Greenway, who became Arizona's first female representative to the U.S. Congress in 1932. The Spanish Colonial Revival main building was designed by Tucson architect Merritt Starkweather. The entire 14-acre (5.7 ha) complex comprises 25 structures, of which 21 contribute to the historic district. The buildings are pink stuccoed masonry structures with blue details, arranged in landscaped gardens with more pink stucco walls. The gardens were designed by landscape architect James Oliphant. Small structures surround the gardens, which are mainly landscaped with native Arizona plants.

The Rockefellers, the Roosevelts, and the Kennedys have stayed at the Arizona Inn numerous times.

== Description ==
Greenway built a house in 1928 at the northwest corner of the site in a style that set the overall character of the hotel complex with stuccoed walls and a tiled roof. Six individual residences were built in 1931. The hotel was built in 1930 with the lobby, reception rooms dining room, kitchen and offices. Four casitas were also built in 1930 housing 23 rooms. The following year five villas were built, comprising 36 rooms. A pool and two supporting structures were added in 1937. The interiors feature plain white walls with corbeled arches connecting major rooms. Several dining and meeting rooms are themed. The Catlin Room features a collection of George Catlin prints, while the African and Safari Rooms contain souvenirs of Greenway's trip to Africa in 1931.

The Arizona Inn was listed on the National Register of Historic Places on April 5, 1988. It continues to operate as a boutique hotel.

== Potter Place ==
Across the street from the Arizona Inn is a small street known as Potter Place. According to David Leighton, historian for the Arizona Daily Star newspaper, the name derives from Dickson and Sue Potter who founded the Potter School, a preparatory school for girls. The Potters, who were from New York, began wintering in Tucson for their son's health and, later conceived the idea for a girls school in Tucson. After the first school year, they purchased the old Frederick Leighton Kramer home, across the street from the Arizona Inn, turning it into the main school building. The property also had on it a large pool built by a previous owner, James Wheeler, which would be used by the school throughout its existence. The Potters also had a few other buildings constructed and a house for themselves built on the property.

Subjects taught at the school included Latin, drama, history, math, French, music, art, science and English. The pupils also had available to them a two-year course in the study of the Bible and Biblical history and Spanish and German could be taken with special arrangements. Individual swimming and tennis lessons were offered to students and occasional ski trips to Mt. Lemmon were allowed for students of "good citizenship".

In 1945, Dickson Potter bought property along North Craycroft Road, north of the old Fort Lowell, and constructed a ranch house and stables. Here, at Potter Ranch, the students received riding lessons from a master who resided at the ranch. There also were annual horse shows that showcased novice and advanced horse jumping, with the winners’ names engraved on the Bob Locke Award. The Potter Ranch is now The Gregory School.

In 1953, the Potter School closed and the buildings were sold to the Sisters of Charity, a Catholic order. The main house of the school was torn down in 2015.
