= List of historic properties in Miami, Arizona =

- town
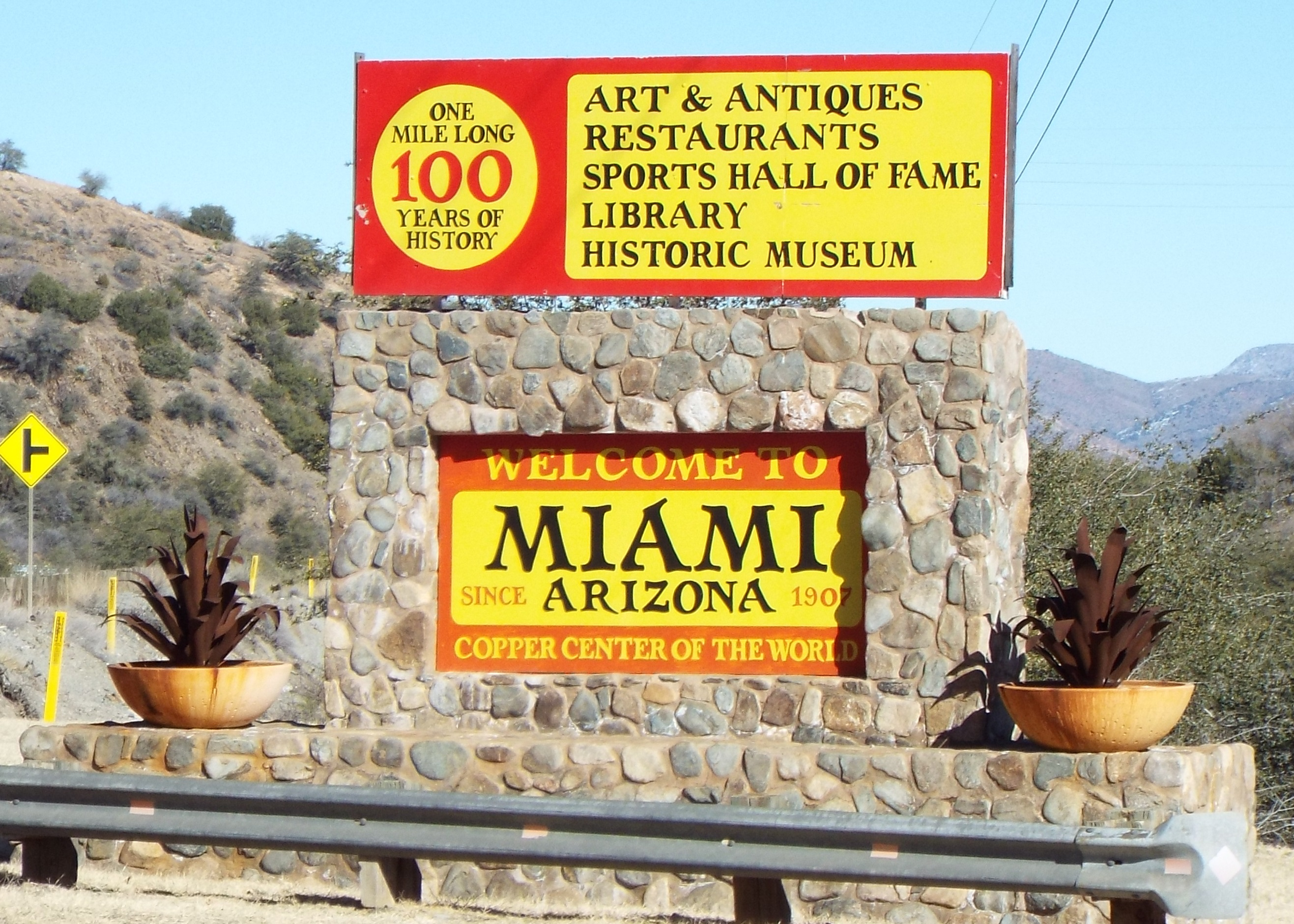
- Welcome to Miami, Arizona

This is a list which includes a photographic gallery, of historic structures, some which are listed in the National Register of Historic Places, of significance in Miami, Arizona, a mining town. Miami was founded by Cleve W. Van Dyke in 1907 and is located on the northeastern slope of the Pinal Mountains, between the towns of Superior and Globe on U.S. Routes 60.

== Brief history ==
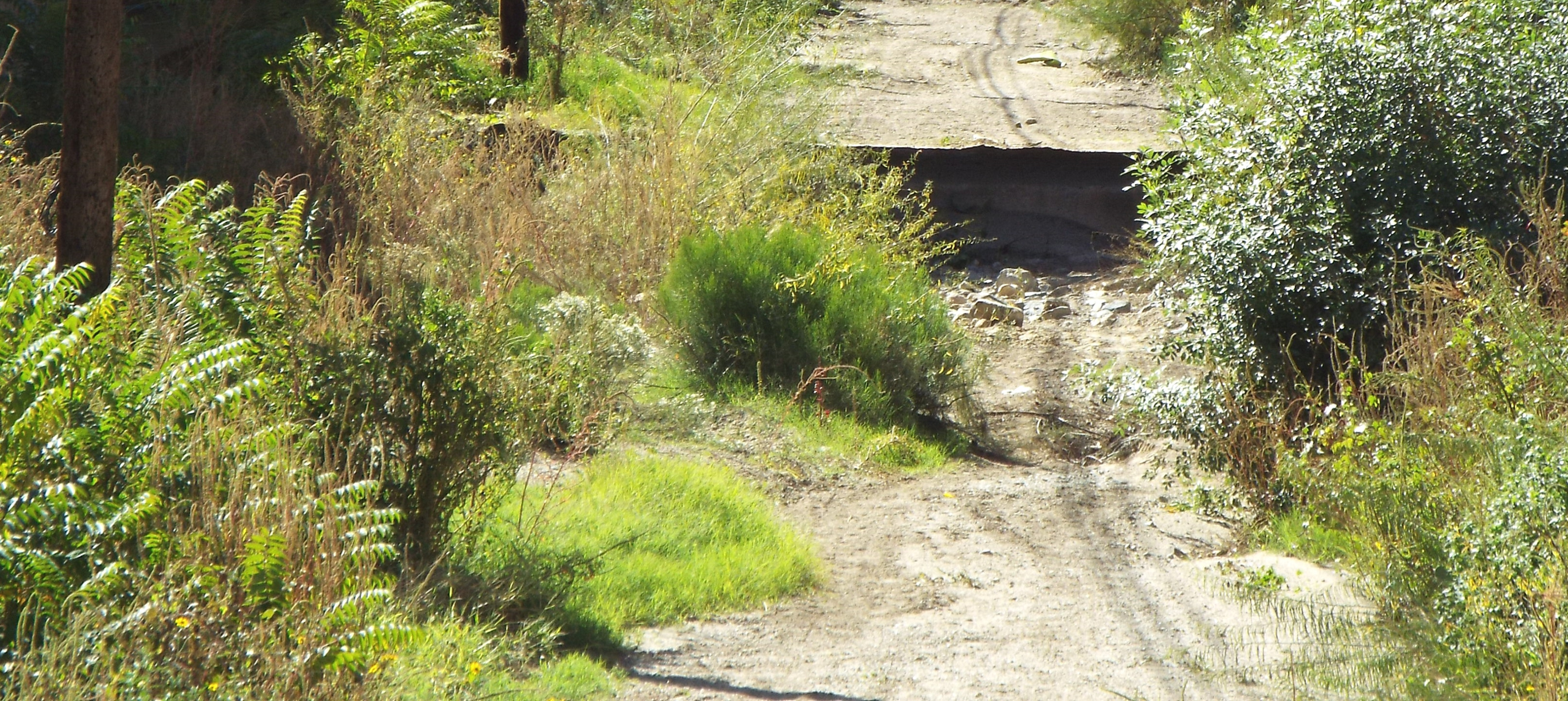
Bloody Tanks Wash

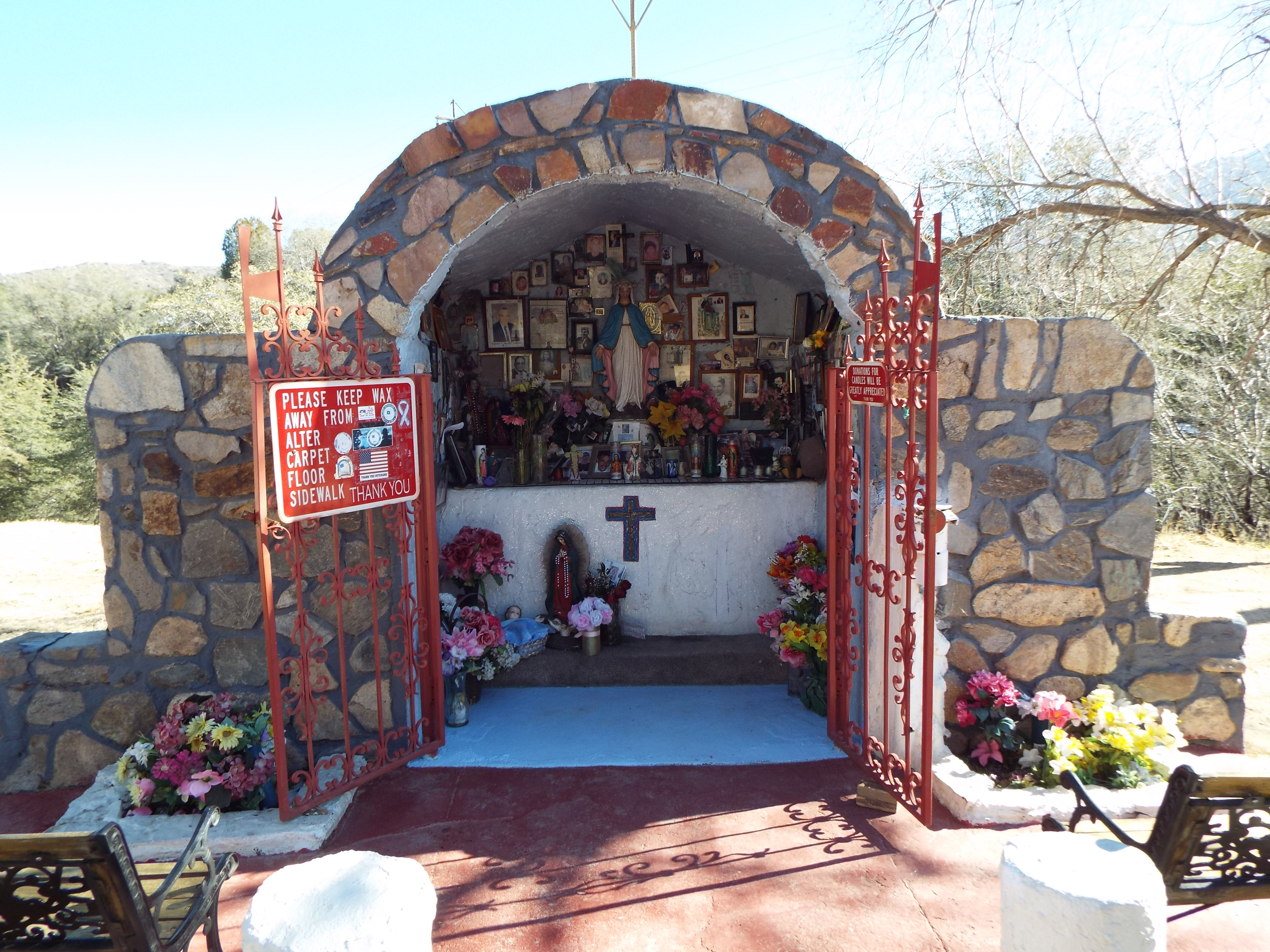
Virgin Mary Shrine

The area surrounding the Pinal Mountains where the town of Miami is now located was inhabited by the Tonto Apache tribe. Silver mining spurred European settlement in the Miami region in the late 1860s. The Apaches would sometimes raid these settlements to steal livestock.

On January 27, 1864, a group of settlers under the leadership of King S. Woolsey decided to confront the Apaches to retrieve their live stock, with the help of Maricopa warriors. They went deep into Apache territory in the Pinal Mountains and soon found themselves surrounded by the hostile Native Americans. Twenty-four Apaches and one Anglo were killed in what became known as the "Bloody Tanks Massacre". The Bloody Tanks Wash was named for this event, since it was said that the red Apache blood filled stream in the wash. This is the stream that would bisect the future town of Miami.

Cleve W. Van Dyke, a local businessman and entrepreneur, purchased land from the Miami Land and Improvement Company with the intent of founding a town. Though the town was officially founded in 1907, it wasn't until after 1908 that miners, businessmen and entrepreneurs began to take an interest in settling there. The price of silver began to drop while the price of copper increased. The Miami Copper Company was established and the mining town flourished.

Van Dyke came up with the idea of celebrating “Miami Townsite Day” on October 11, 1909. With the help and support of real estate companies in Globe, Van Dyke organized several events to create enthusiasm among the public. Following this promotion, his land lots in the new town sold easily.

Eventually, the Phelps Dodge Corporation bought out the Miami Copper Company and took over the day-to-day operations of the mine. Freeport-McMoRan then bought Phelps Dodge and continued the daily operations of the mine.

== Historic buildings pictured ==
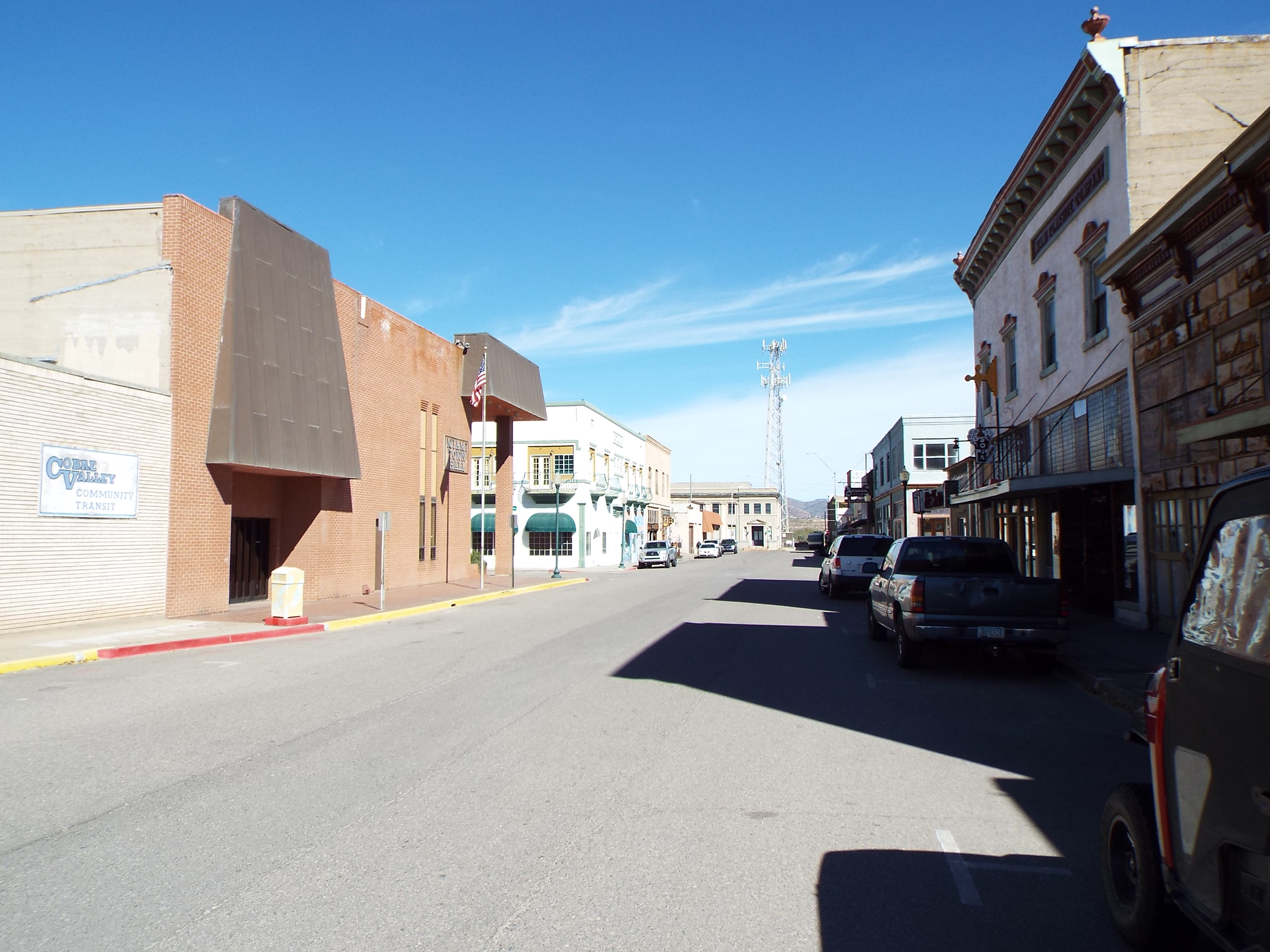
Historic Sullivan Street

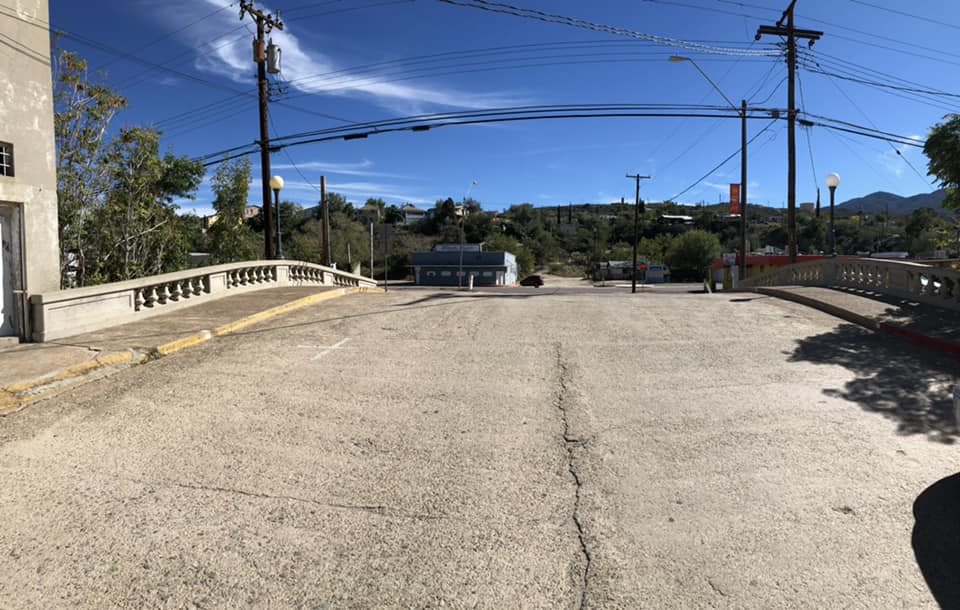
Cordova Avenue Bridge

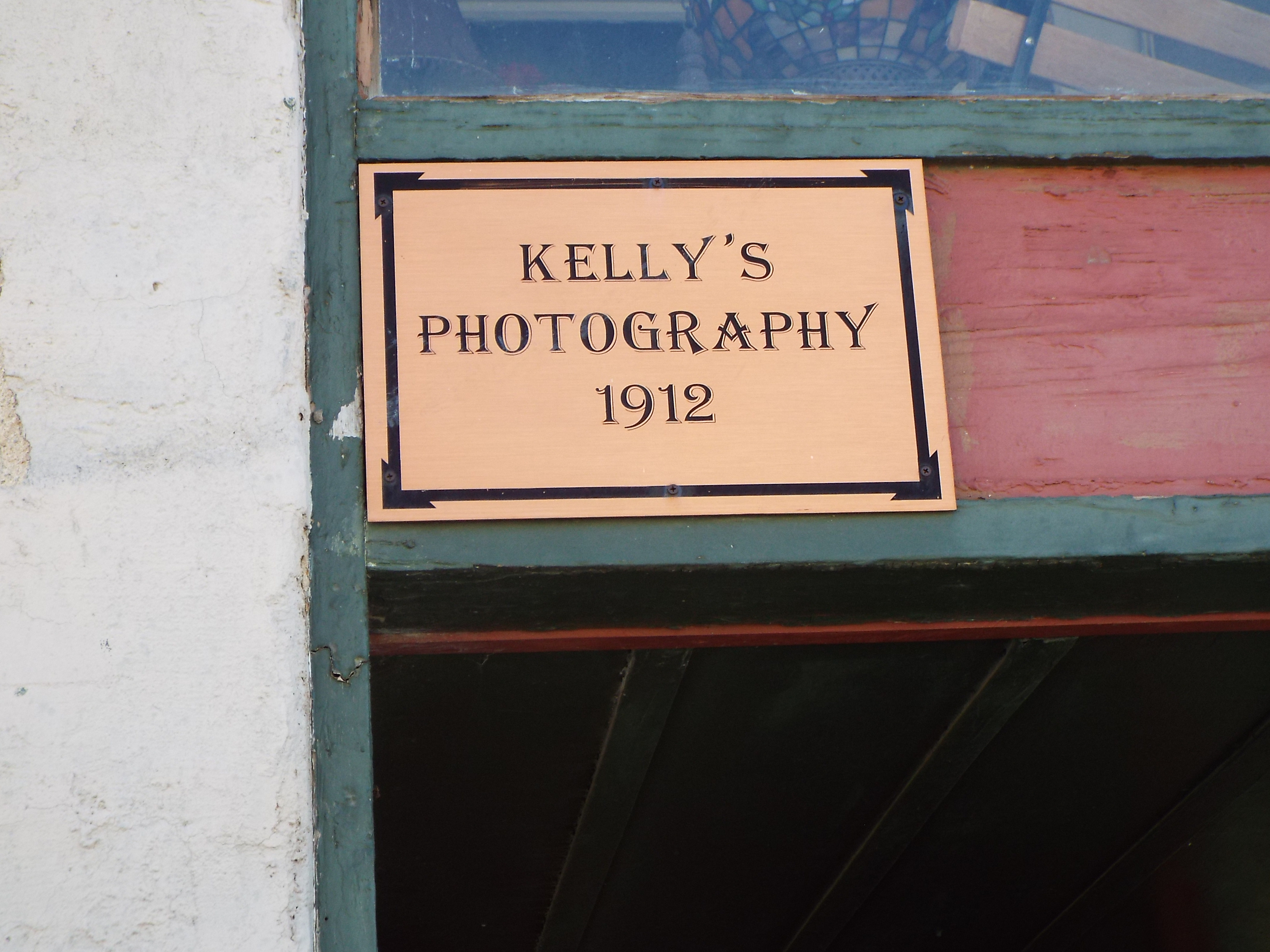
Kelly's Photography 1912 sign

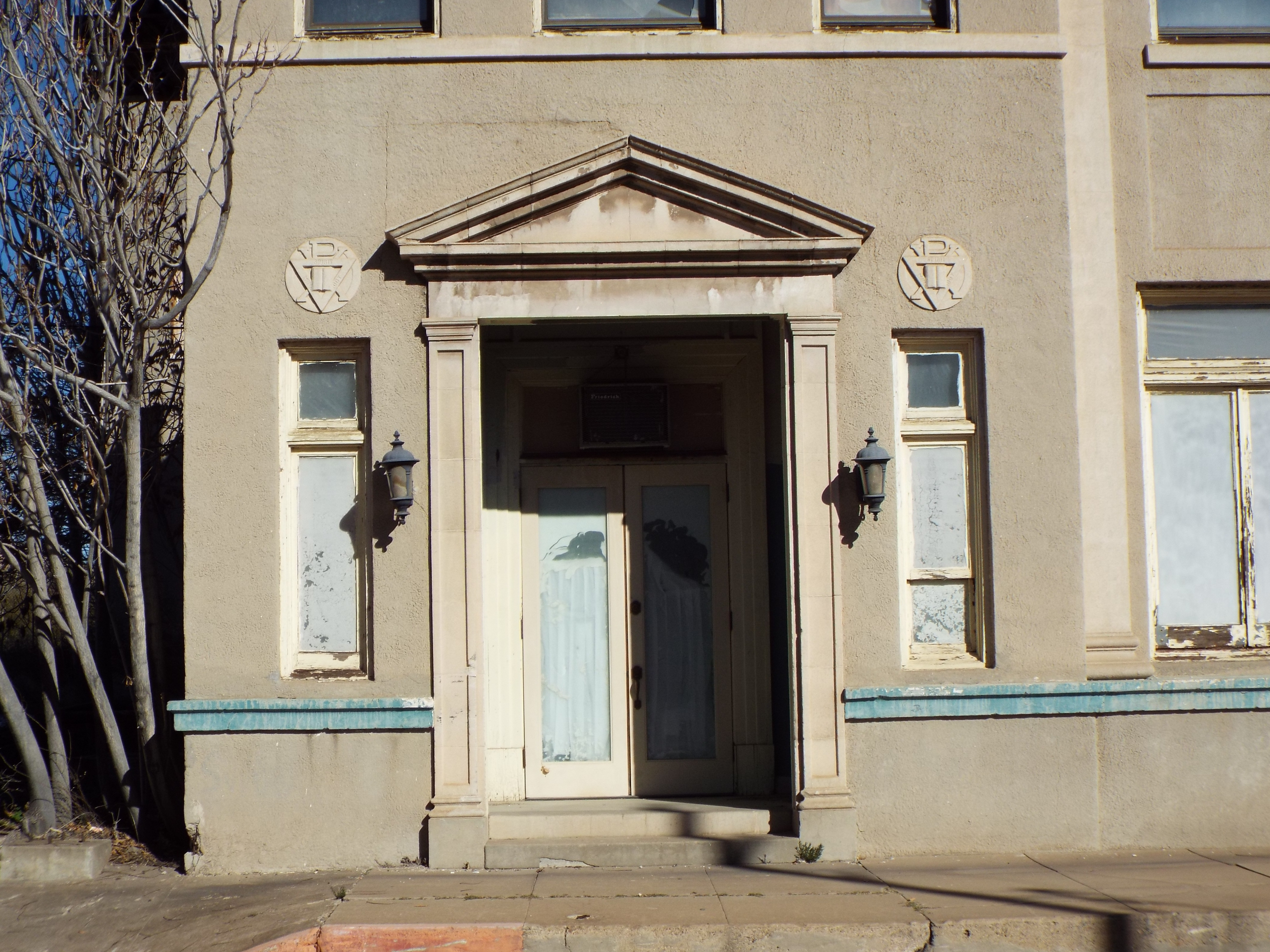
YMCA

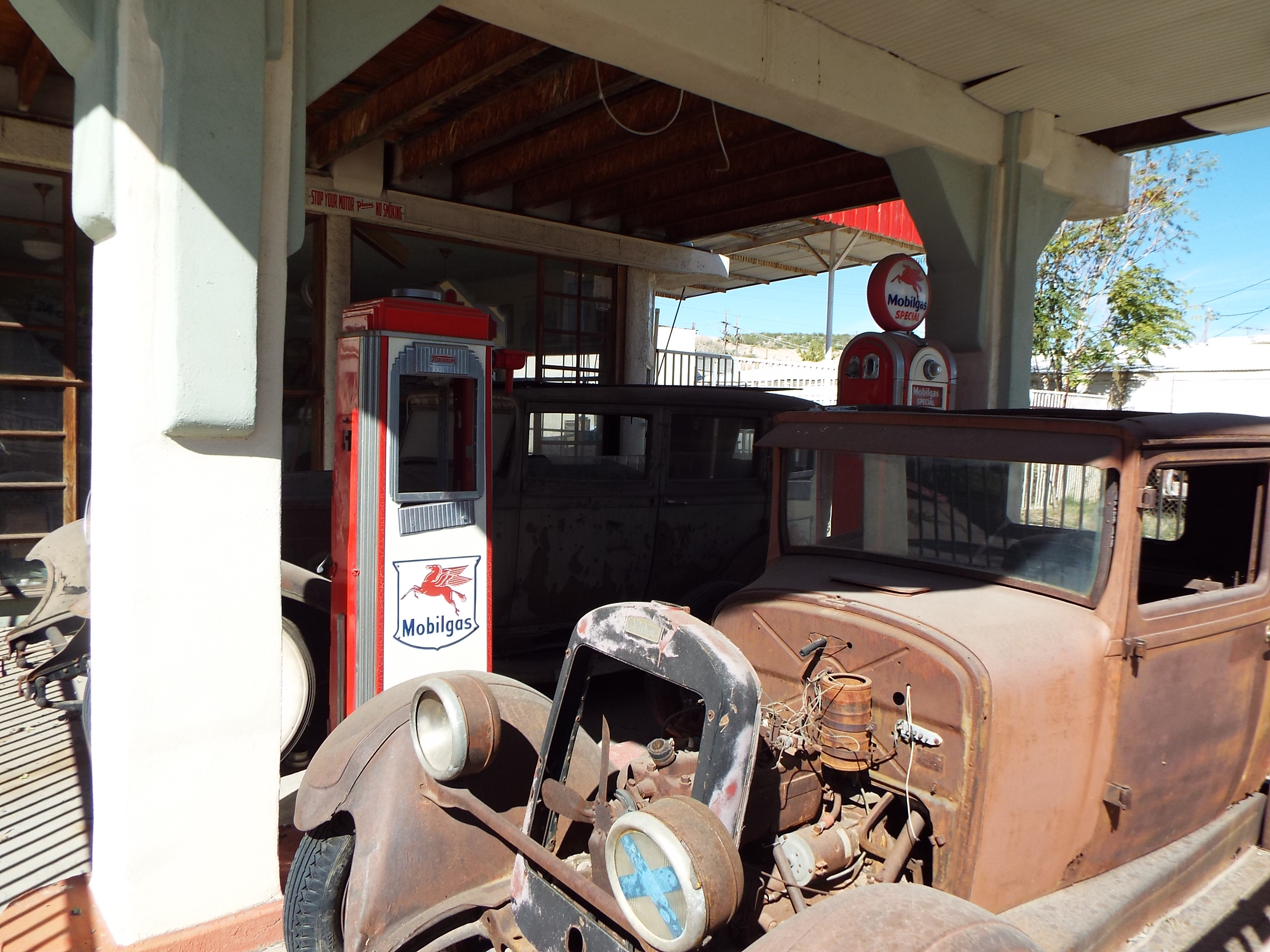
1920s Mobil Gas Station

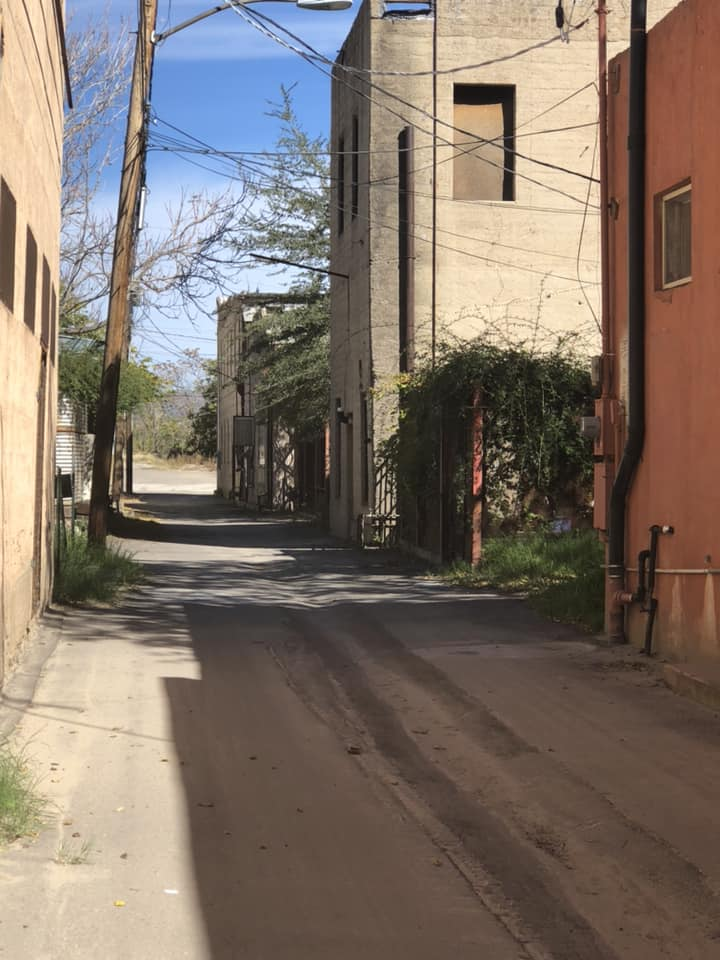
Sykes Alley

Miami has various properties listed in the National Register of Historic Places. Among these properties are five Luten arch concrete bridges built by the Topeka Bridge & Iron Co. over the Bloody Tanks Wash. They are the Miami, Inspiration, Keystone, Cordova and Reppy Avenue bridges. All the bridges were built in 1918, with the exception of the Reppy Ave. bridge which was built in 1921.

- The Miami Ave. Bridge – Listed in the NRHP on March 31, 1989, Ref. #88001693.
- The Inspiration Ave. Bridge – Listed in the NRHP on March 7, 1989, Ref. #88001691.
- The Keystone Ave. Bridge – Listed in the NRHP on March 7, 1989, Ref. #88001692.
- The Cordova Ave. Bridge – Listed in the NRHP on March 7, 1989, Ref. #88001690.
- The Reppy Ave. Bridge – Listed in the NRHP on September 30, 1988, Ref. #88001689.
- The Keystone Stairs – Built in 1910 on Keystone Ave.
- The Unique Theatre – Built in 1915 and located at 522 Sullivan Street.
- The Gila Valley Bank and Trust Co. – Built in 1910 and located at 500 W, Gibson St.
- The Bullion Plaza School – The school was built in 1923 and is located at 150 Plaza Circle. It is historically important for its association with the history of Mexican Americans and school segregation in Arizona. The school was listed in the National Register of Historic Places on January 4, 2001, Ref. #00001591. The building now houses the Bullion Plaza Cultural Center & Museum.
- The Wilton's Paint and Wallpaper building – Built in 1912 and located at 123 N. Miami Avenue.
- The 'Gem Theatre' – Built in 1915 and located at 520 Sullivan Street.
- The Soderman Building – Built in 1917 and located on 198 Chrisholm Ave. The building was listed in the NRHP on May 11, 2000, Ref. #0000465.The Soderman building was originally constructed as a two-story frame building. It was converted to concrete construction and housed a bar on the ground floor and a rooming house for Scandinavian miners on the top floor.
- Our Lady of the Blessed Sacrament Church – The church, which originally called "Our Lady of Mt. Carmel" was built in 1917 and is located at 844 Sullivan Street. It was listed in the National Register of Historic Places on January 8, 2008, Ref. #07001332.
- YMCA Building – built in 1917 and located at 155 North Miami Ave.
- Commercial Building – built in 1916 and located 143 N. Miami Ave.
- Miami Community Church – The structure was built in 1920 and is located at 305 Live Oak Street. It was listed in the National Register of Historic Places on March 15, 2005, Ref. #05000137. The building is now occupied by the Divine Grace Presbyterian Church.
- The Fritzpatrick Building – The structure was built in 1909 was the first building in Miami. It is located at 53 Keystone Ave. It was also, the first poured concrete building in Miami.
- Kelly's Photography Building – The structure was built in 1911 and is located at 517 Sullivan Street. Roy F. Kelley, his wife, Mary E. Mallarky and her brother, Andrew J opened their photography studio in 1914. It now houses the Joshua's Tree House Antique Store.
- Price Brothers Building – The structure was built in 1913 and is located at 508 Sullivan Street. Ray Price, the owner of the building had a meat market there.
- The Travelers Hotel – The hotel was built in 1918 and is located at 621 Sullivan Street. One of the first hotels to be built in Miami.
- Firehouse Building – The first firehouse of Miami was built in 1915 and is located 422 Gibson Street.
- First Baptist Church Building – The structure located at 534 Gibson Street was built in 1915 and is now in a total state of abandonment.
- Cleaning and Pressing Shop – The structure was in 1910 and is located at 420 Gibson Street. The dry cleaning business was established in 1911 and was owned by I.N. Fuller. It is adjacent to the firehouse.
- Abandoned Protestant Church – The structure was built in 1915 and is located at 534 Gibson Street.
- Bank of Miami – The structure was built in 1916 and is located on the corner of Keystone Ave. and Sullivan Street.
- Mobil Gas Station – The gas station was established in 1920 in 314 Live Oak Street.
- 416 West Sullivan Street building – built in 1915. It now houses the Cowgirl Antiques. Entrance to the store is through the Wild Horses Saloon. It was the first two-story building on Sullivan Street and today boasts of being the only antique store that has its own saloon.
- Miami Townsite building – Built in 1911, by one of the founding fathers of Miami, Cleve Van Dyke. Van Dyke had his office in the second floor of the building which is located on 505 W. Sullivan Street. The building housed Ne-Way Grocers and kater Nader's Emporium Clothing Store. In 1913, an addition was built which housed a Western Union office and confectioner. The building now houses Pop's Soda Fountain and Antiques.
- Central Drug Co. – The structure where the drug store was established was built in 1920 and is located at 600 Sullivan Street. That same year Harold "Doc" Copp opened the Central Drug Company. It was a time that Miami was a thriving mining town.
- Virgin Mary Shrine – Located on Hwy 60. It was created in 1952 by a Korean War Veteran.
- United Jewelry/Commercial Hotel Building – Located at 509 Sullivan Street. Two-story poured concrete building that originally housed United Loan & Jewelry with the small Commercial Hotel/Apt Building Upstairs for travelers.

== Historic structures ==
The following are the images of the historic structures in Miami and its surrounding areas.

Historic structures in Miami

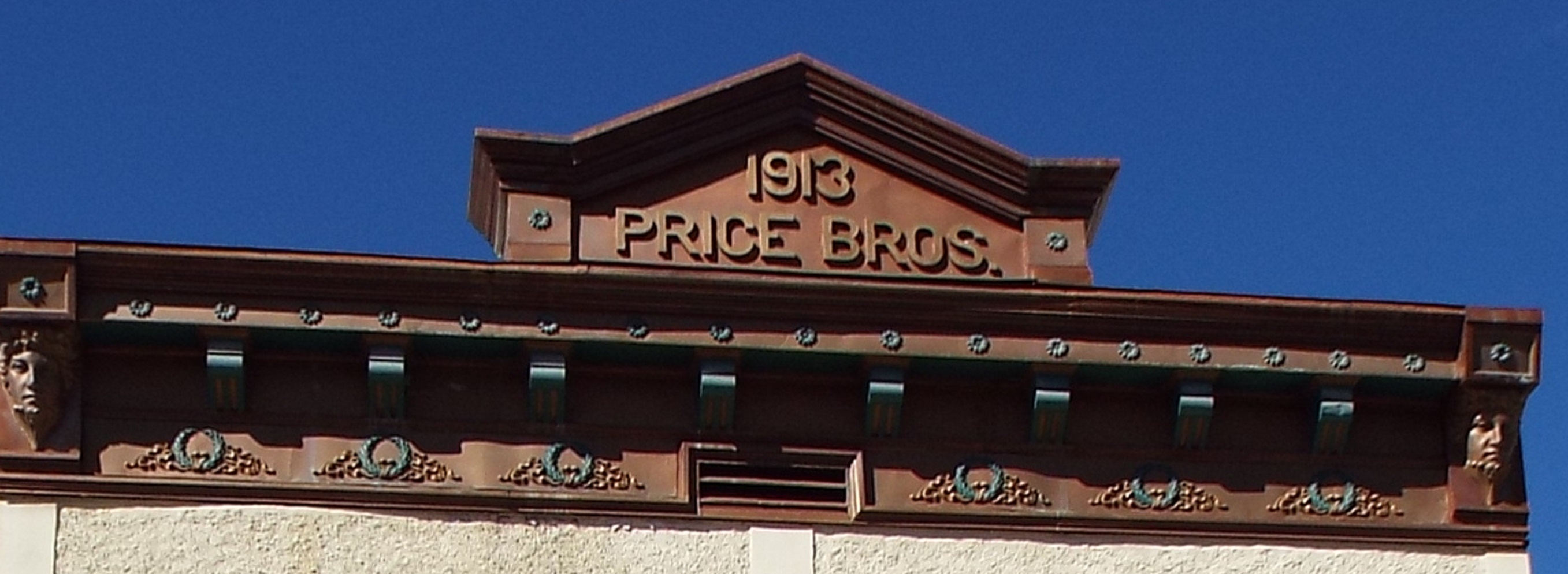
Price Brothers Building

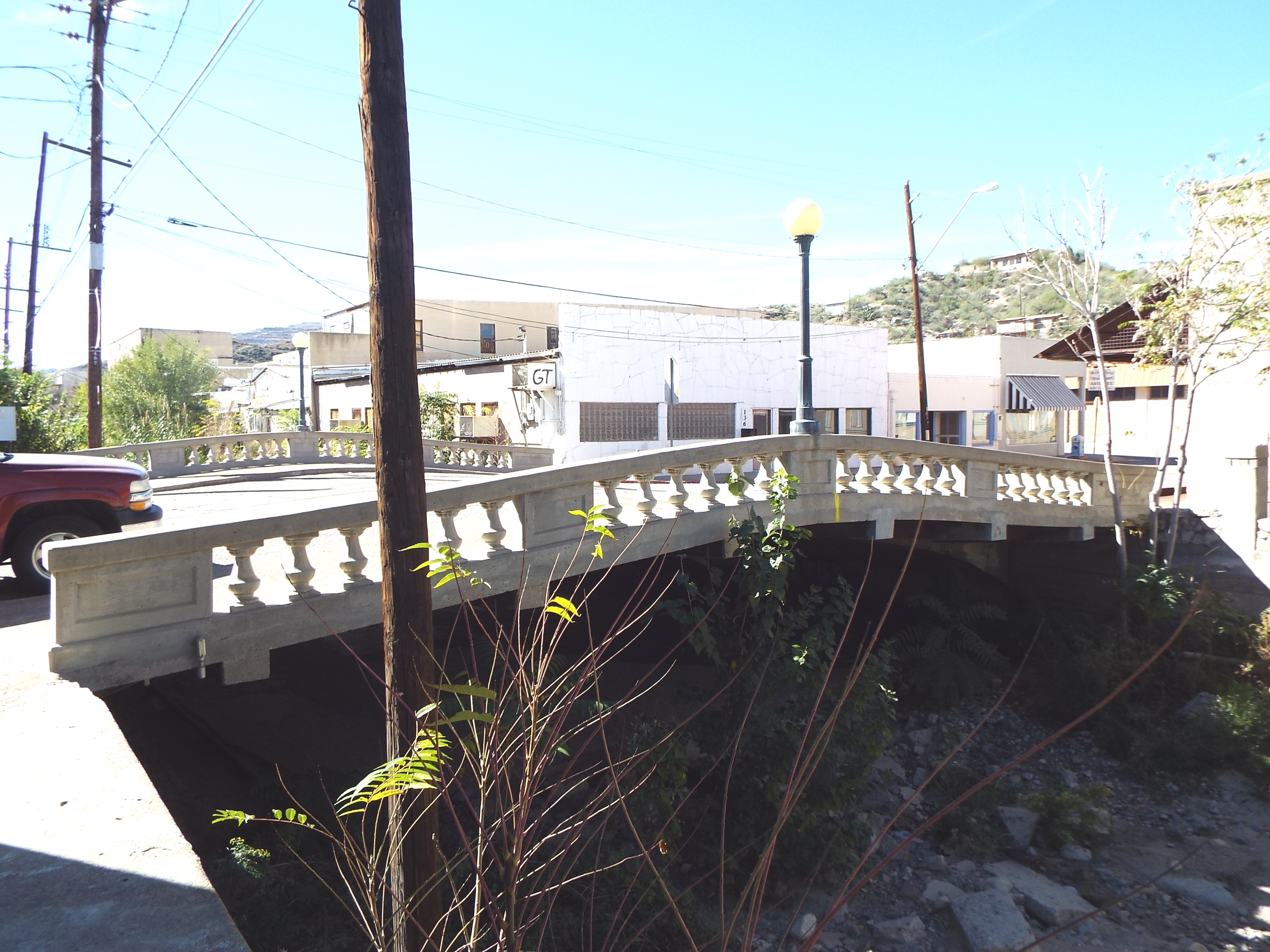
Miami Ave. Bridge

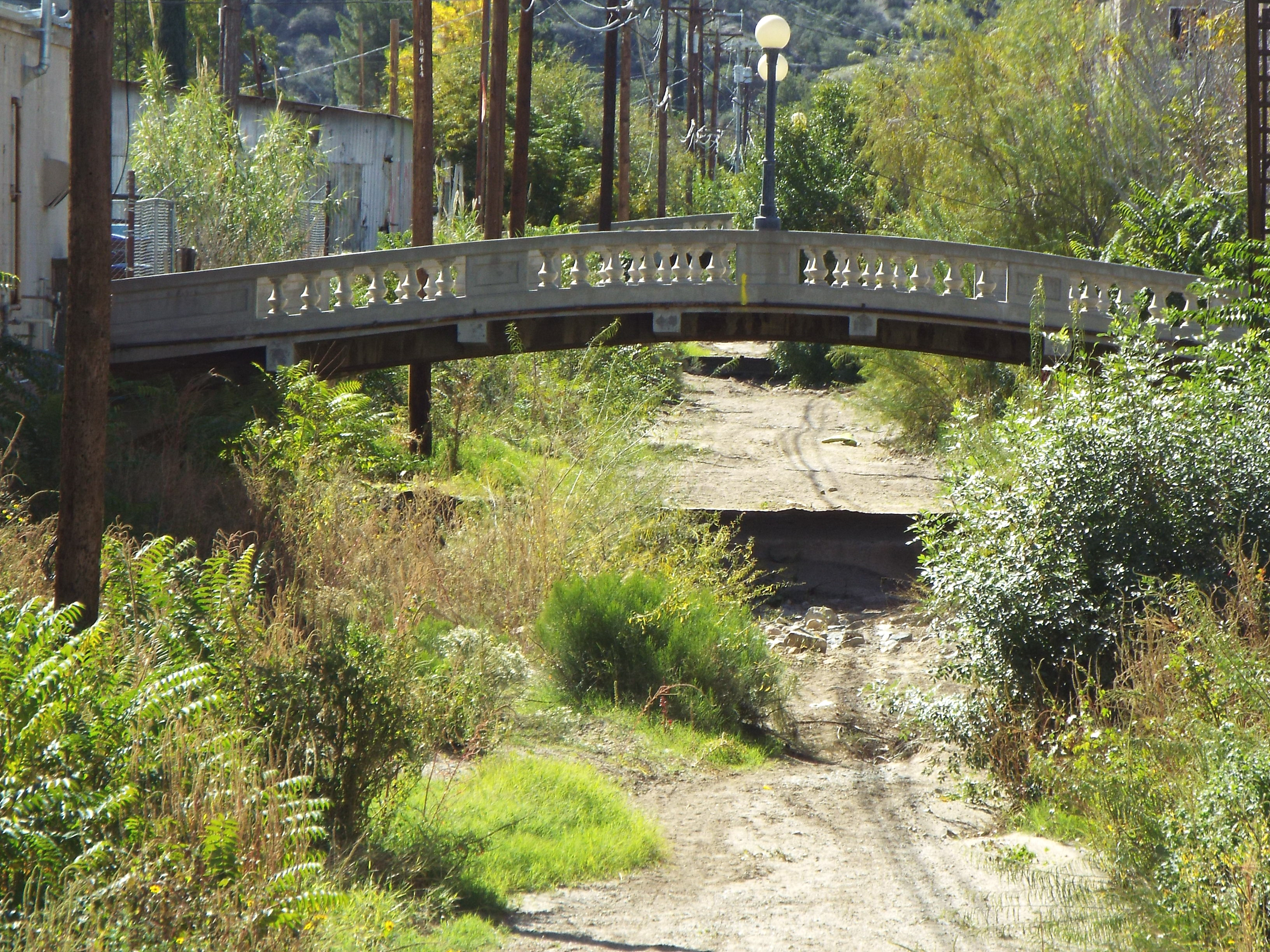
Inspiration Ave. Bridge

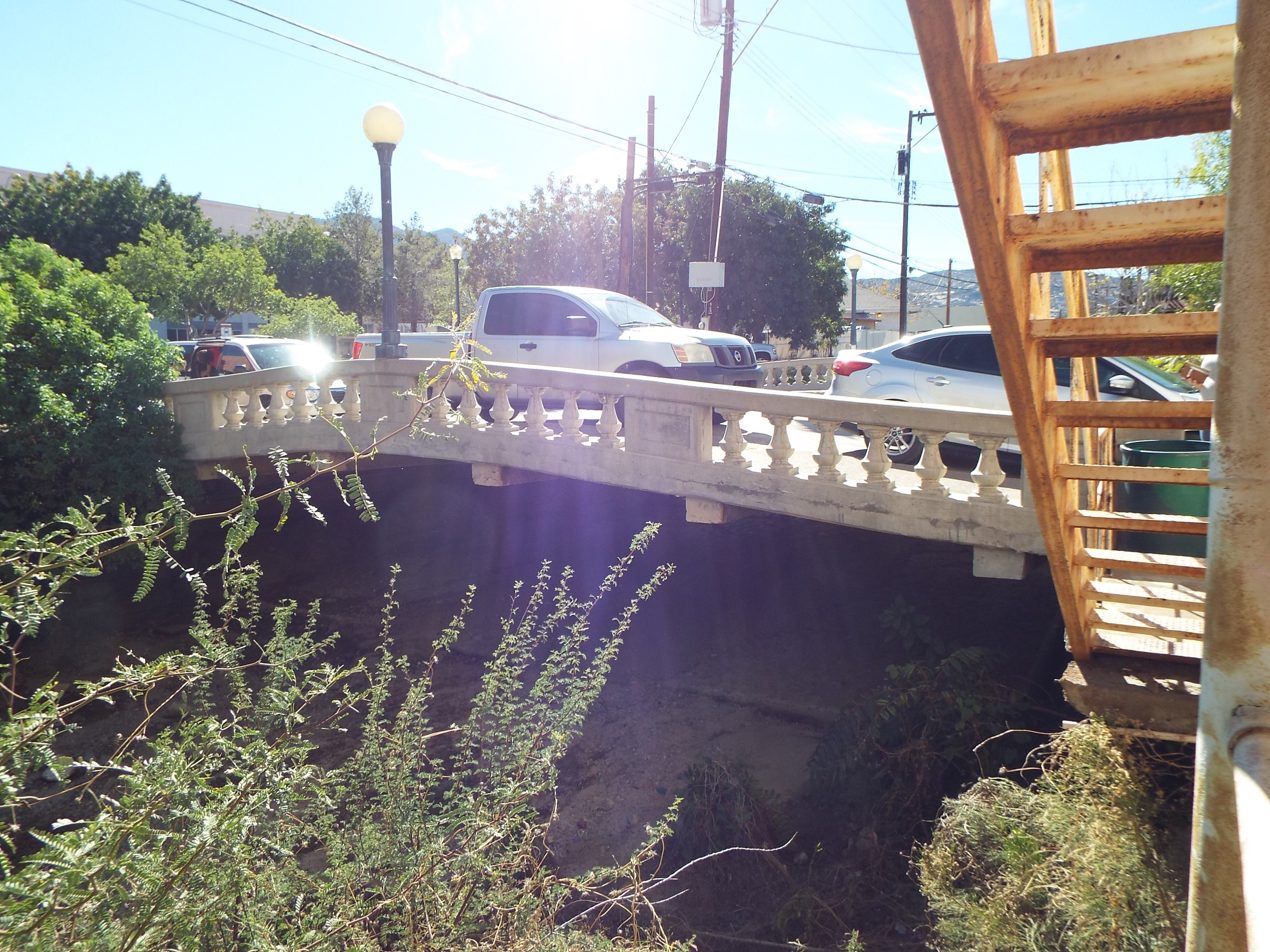
Keystone Ave. Bridge

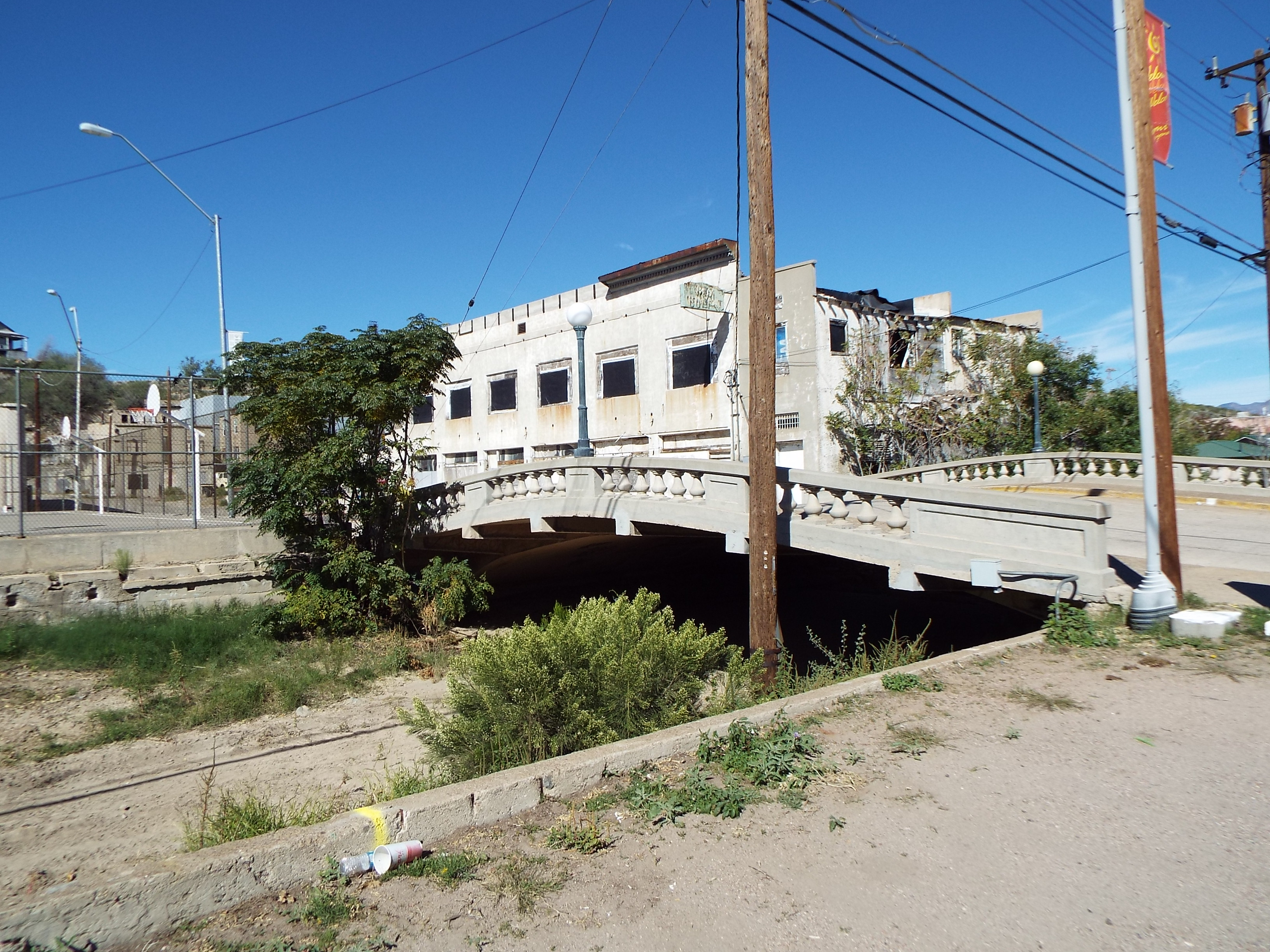
Cordova Ave. Bridge

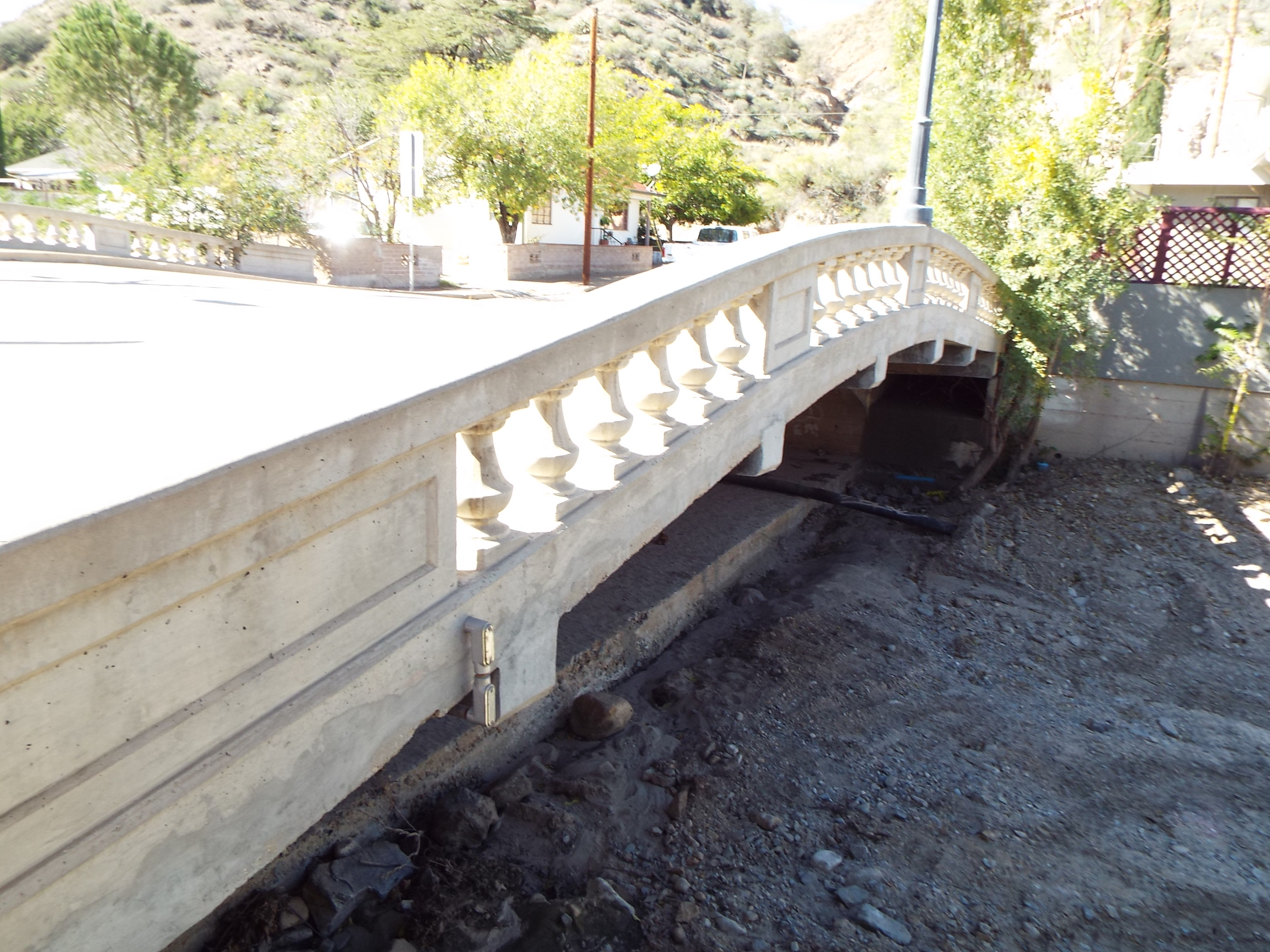
Reppy Ave. Bridge

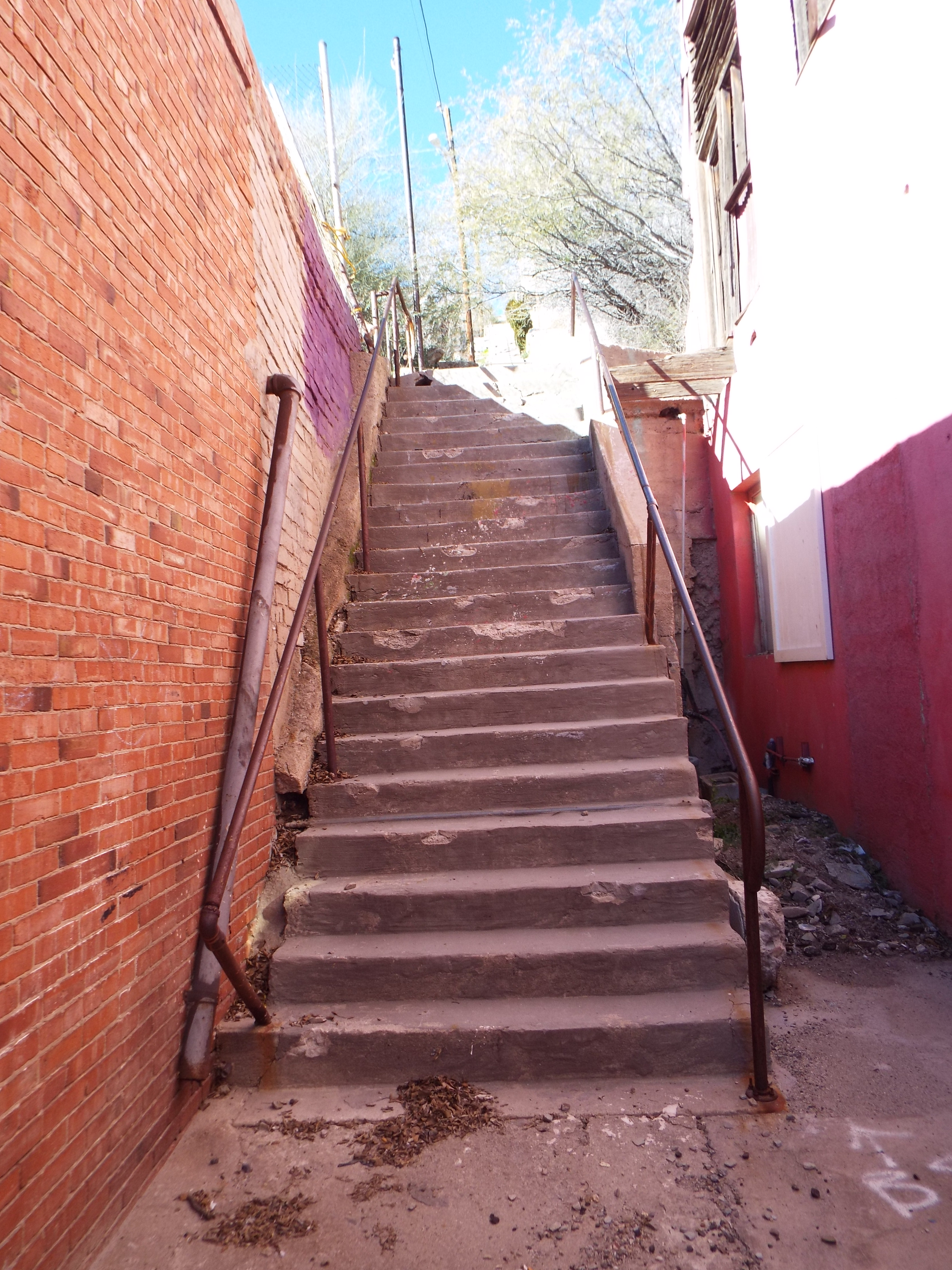
Keystone Stairs

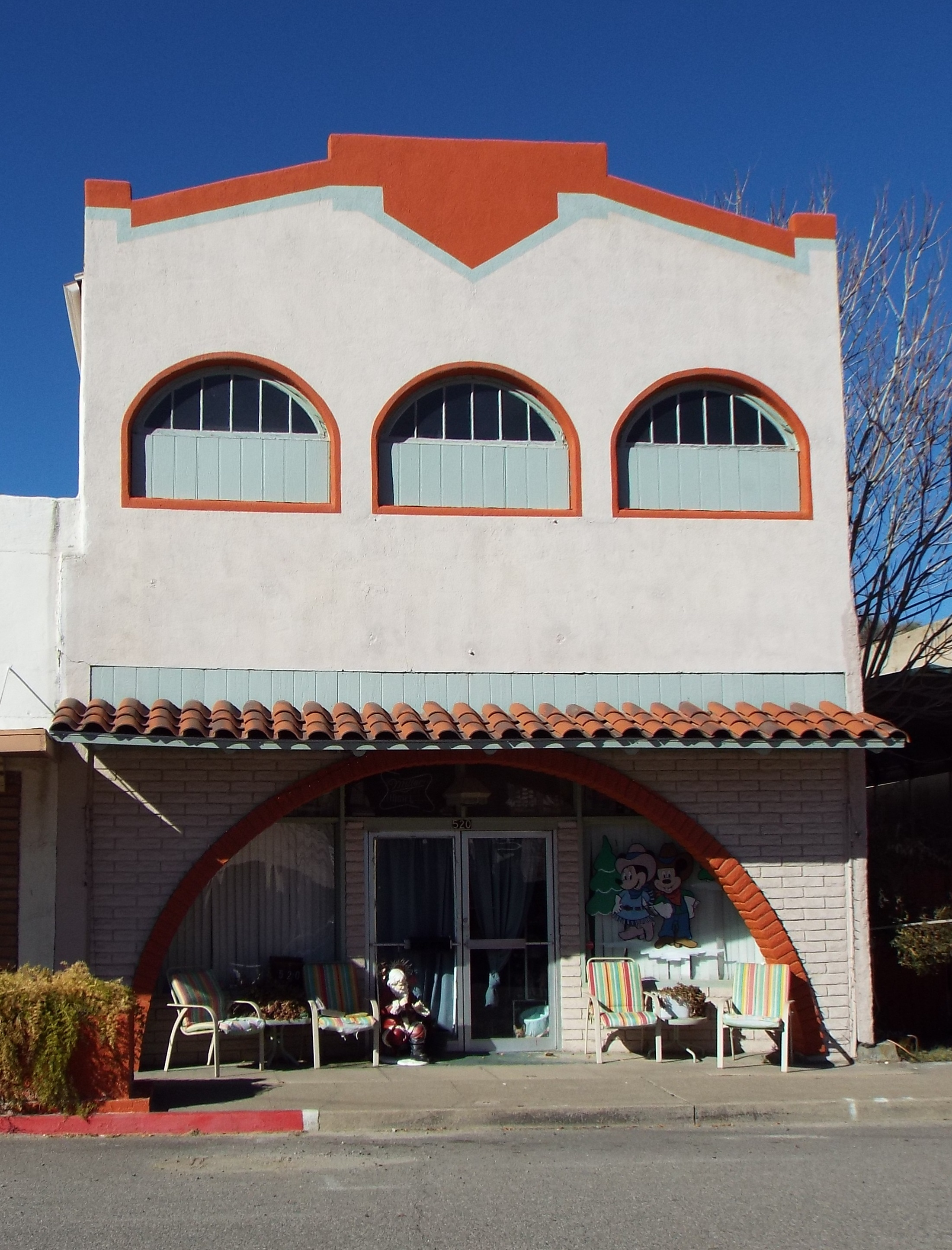
Unique Theater

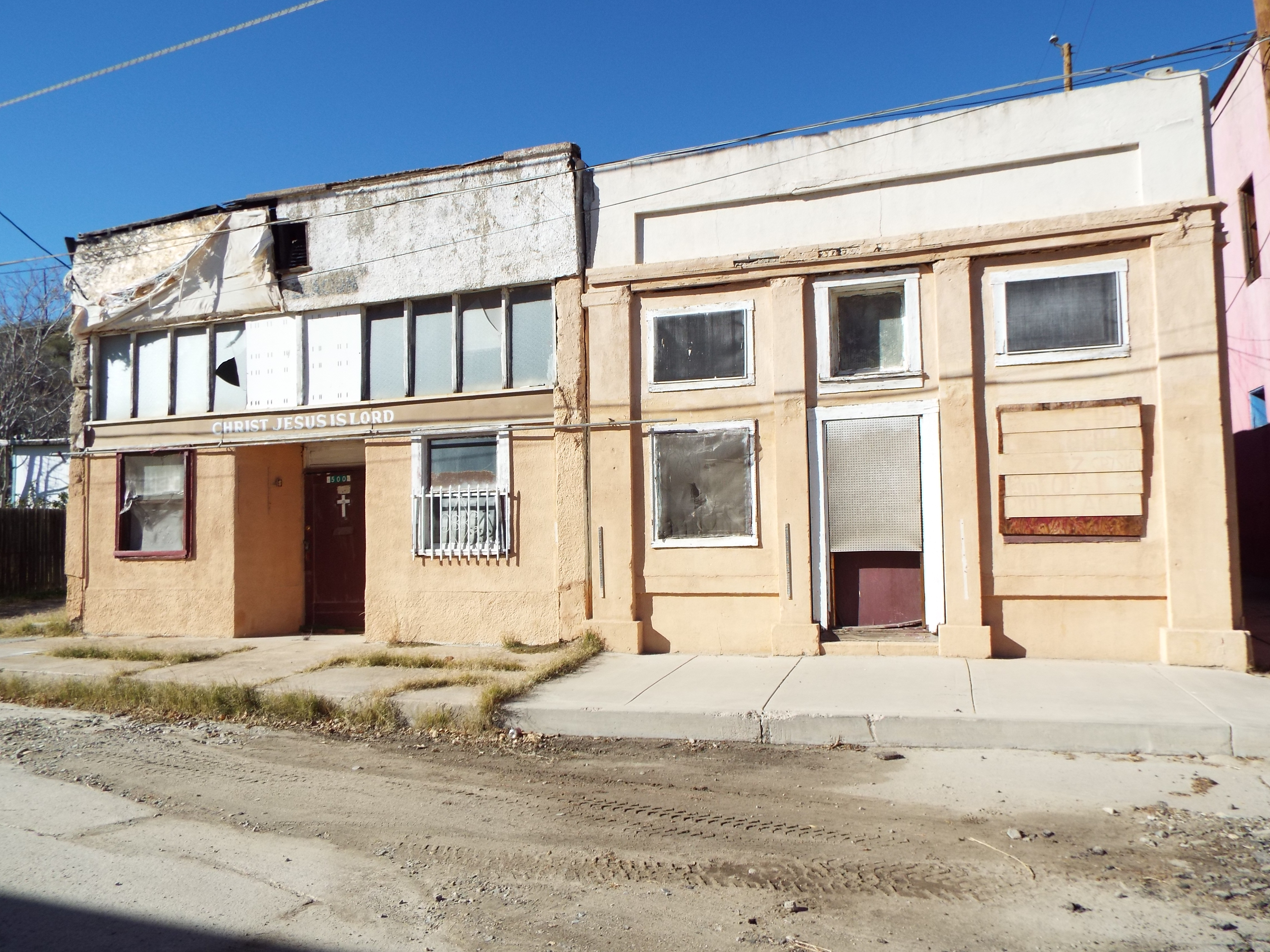
Gila Valley Bank and Trust Co.

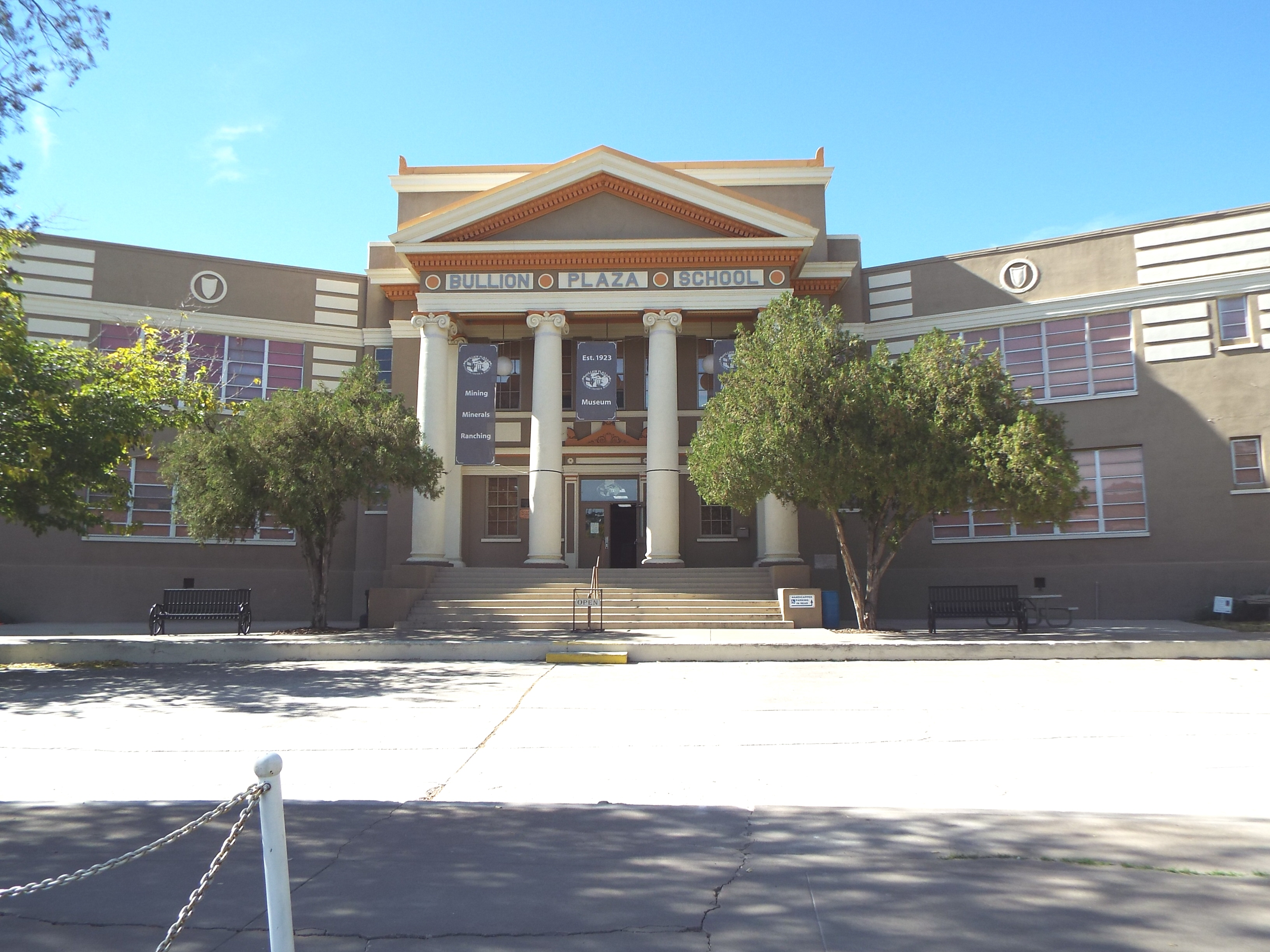
Bullion Plaza School

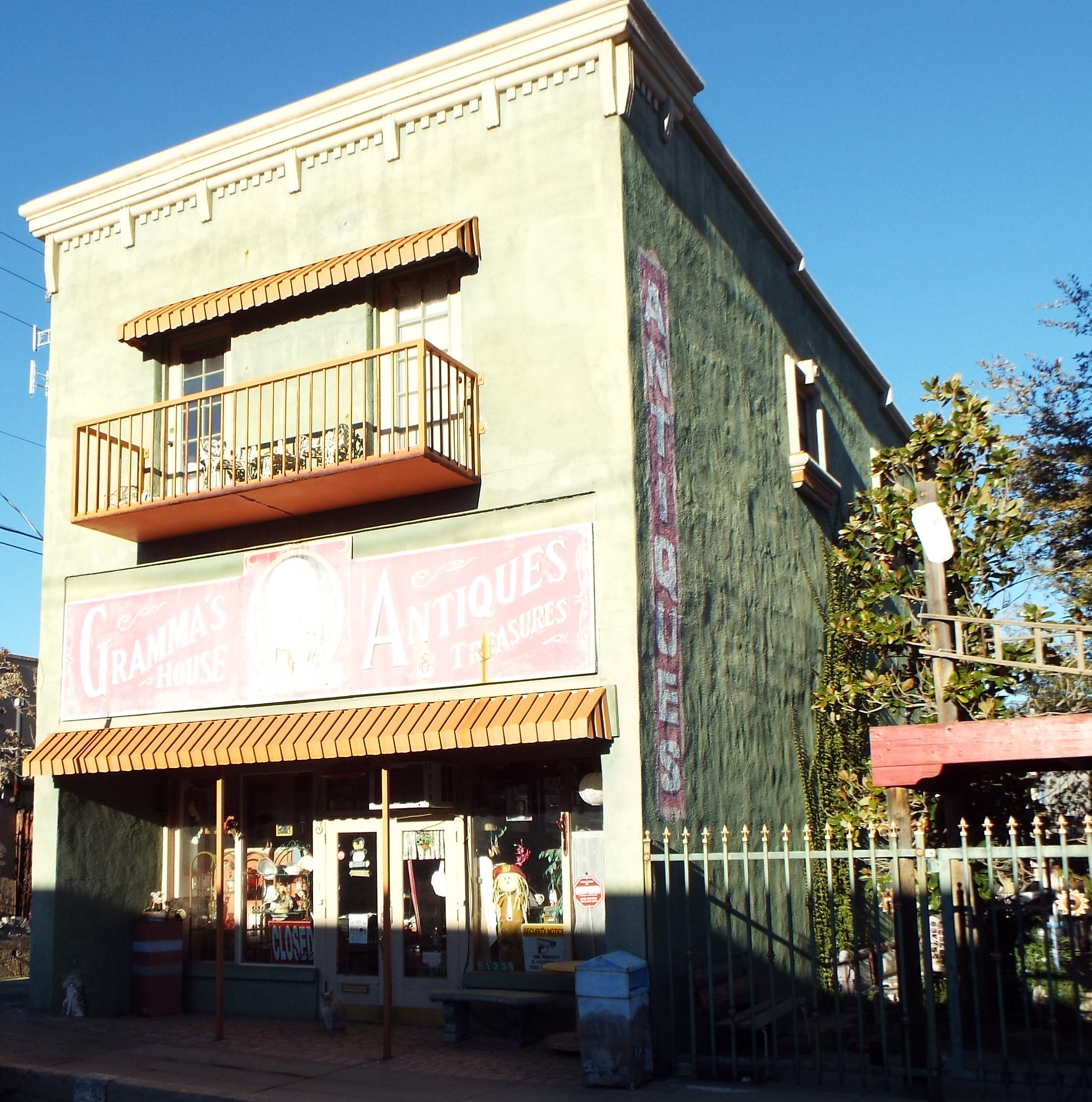
Wilton’s Paint and Wallpaper

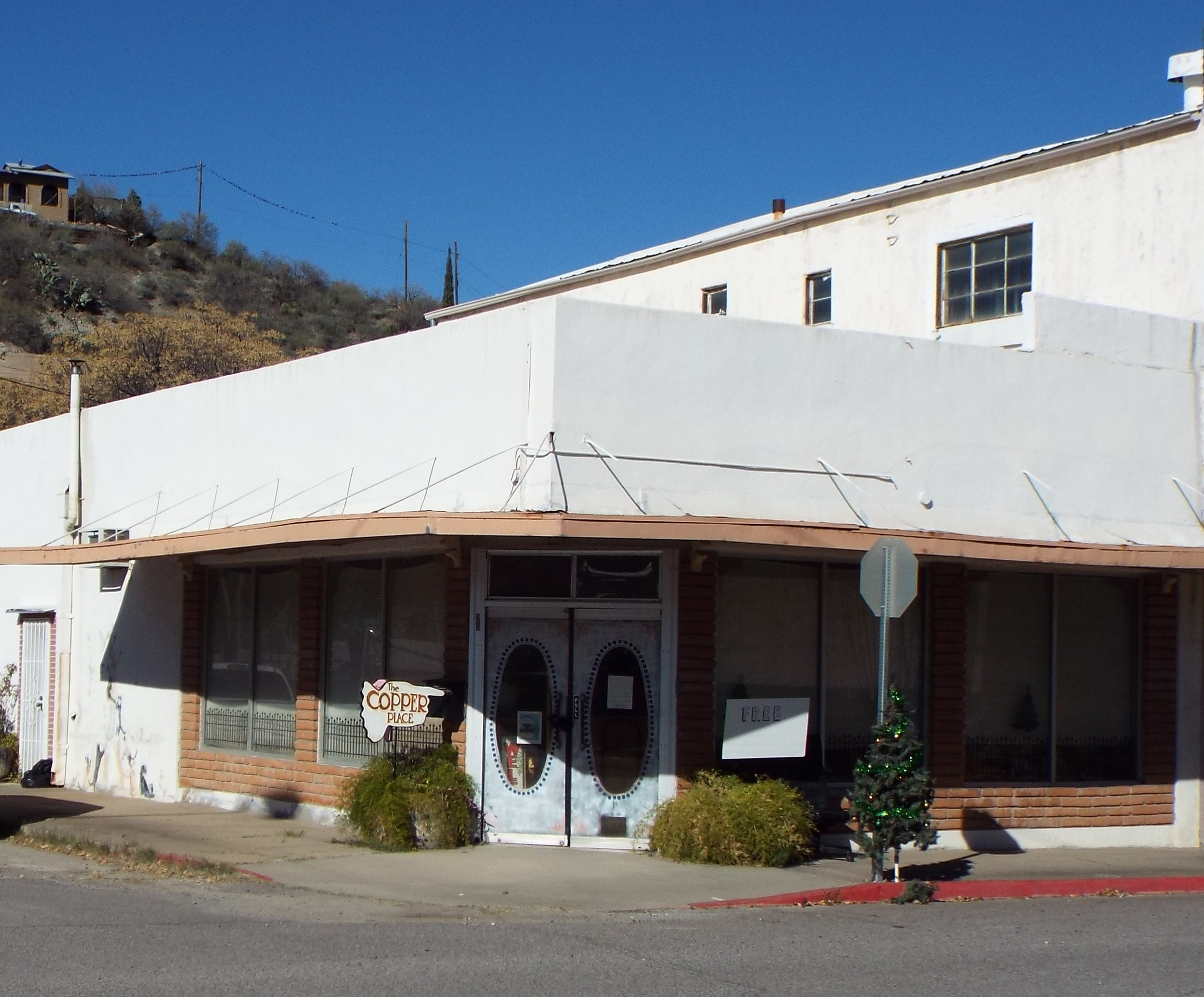
Gem Theatre

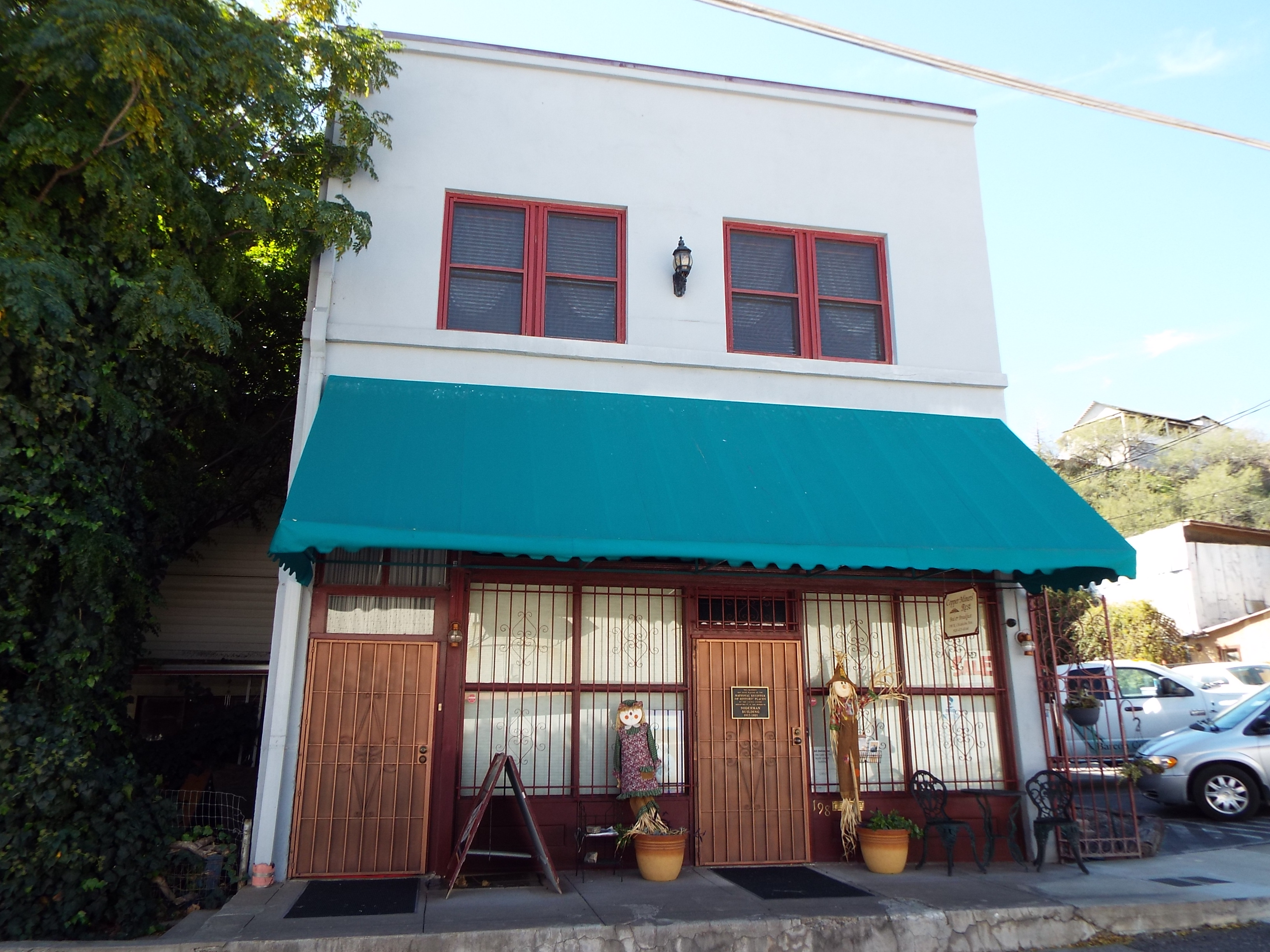
Soderman Building

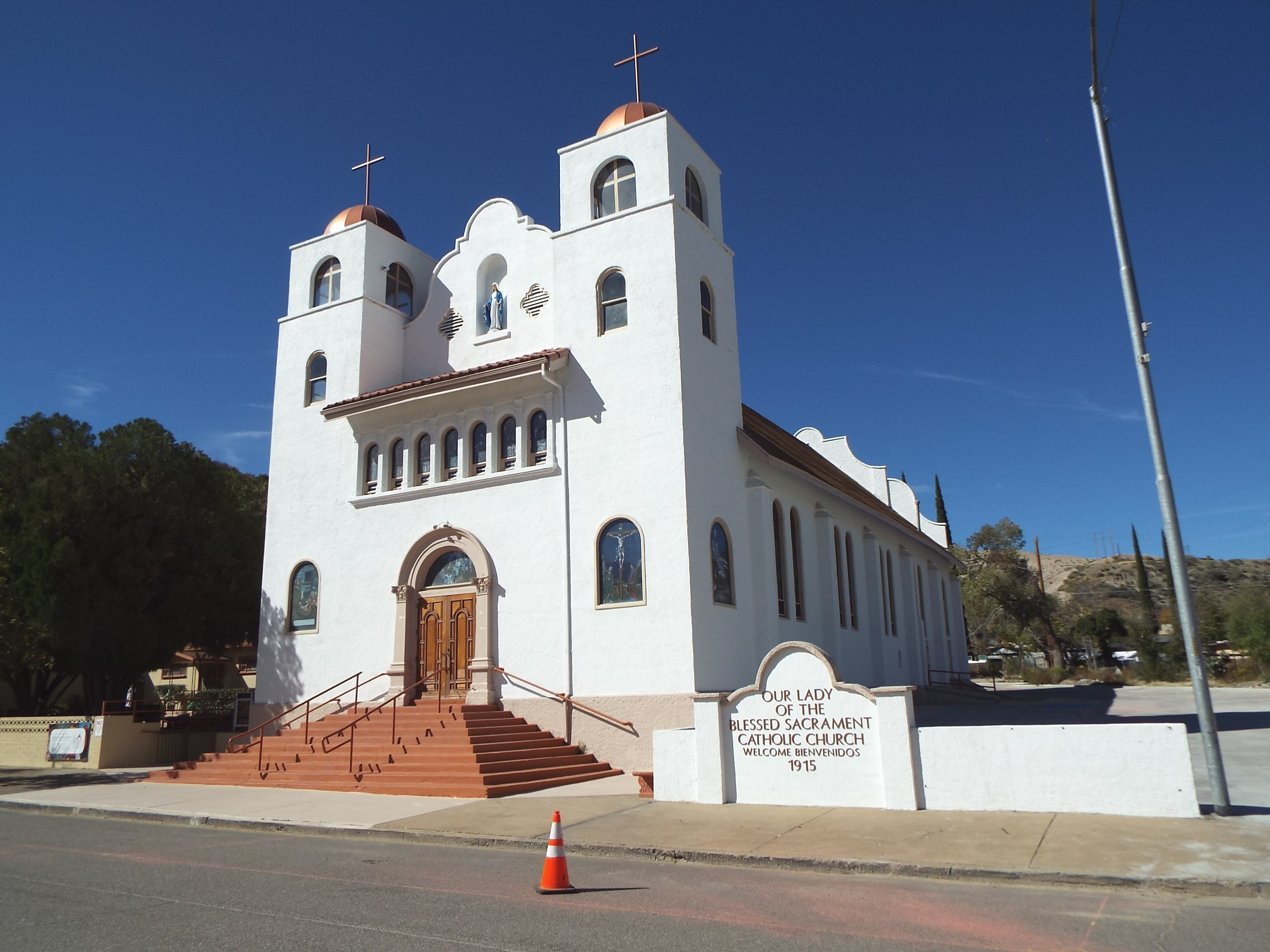
Our Lady of the Blessed Sacrament

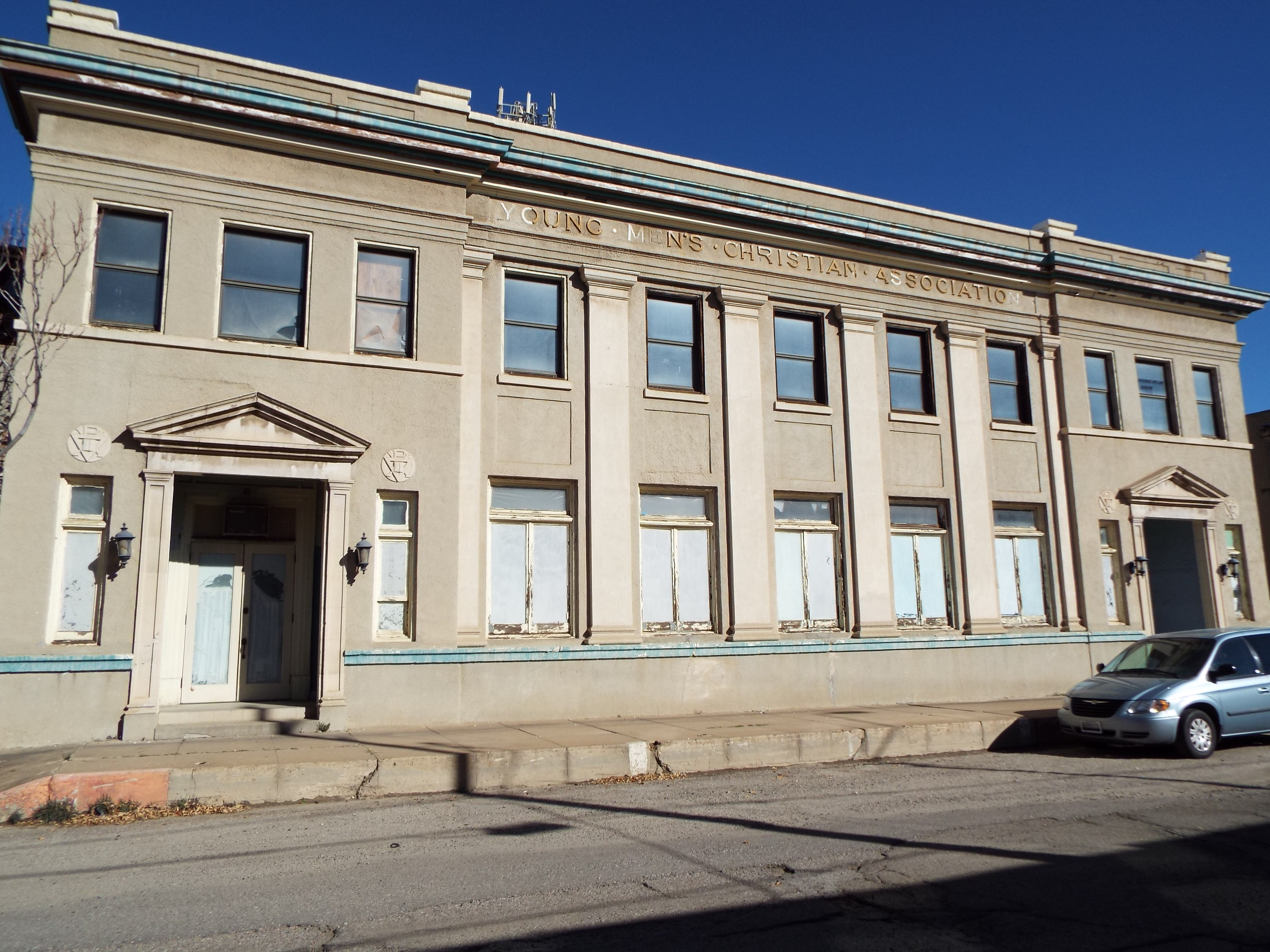
YMCA Building

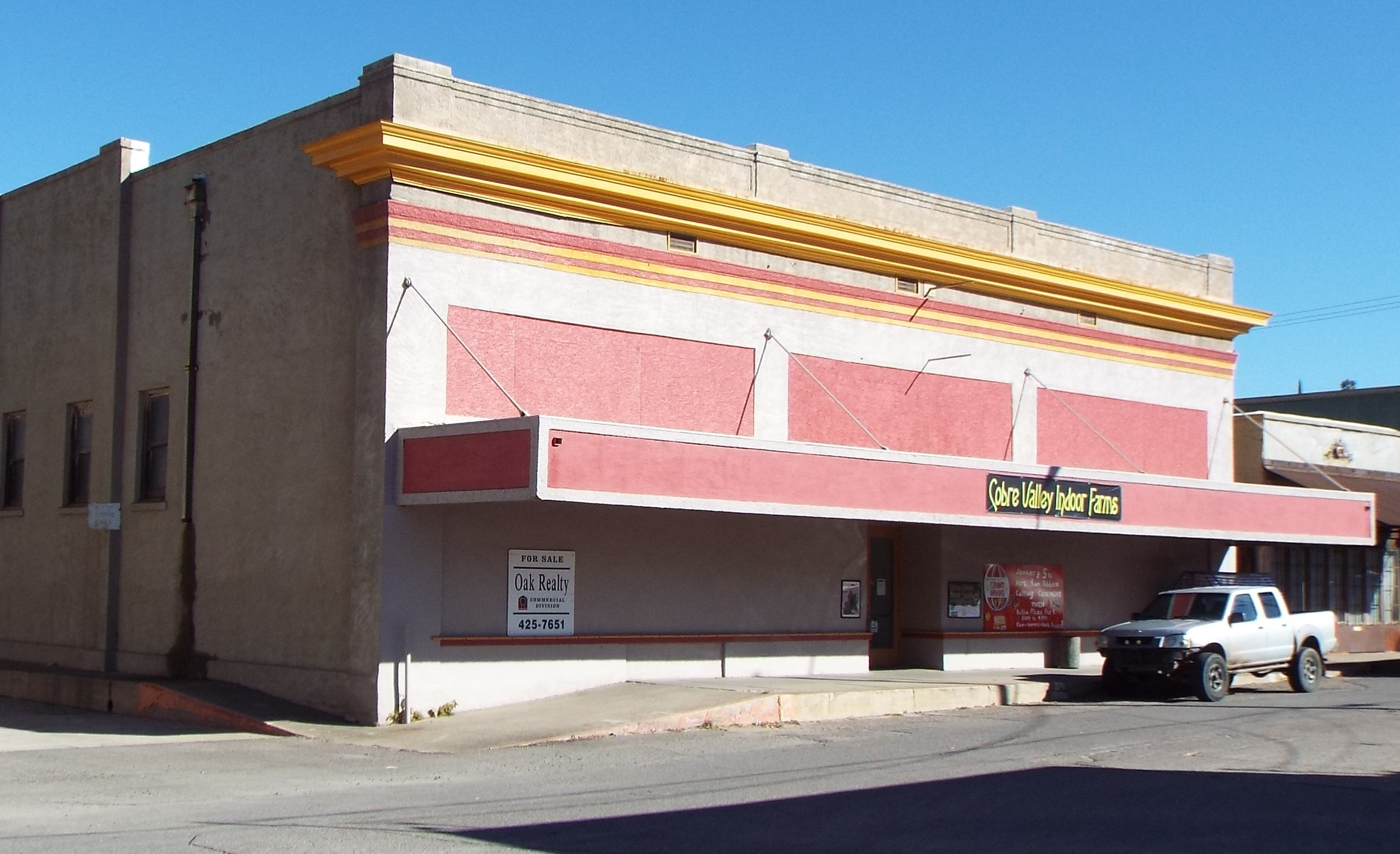
Commercial Building

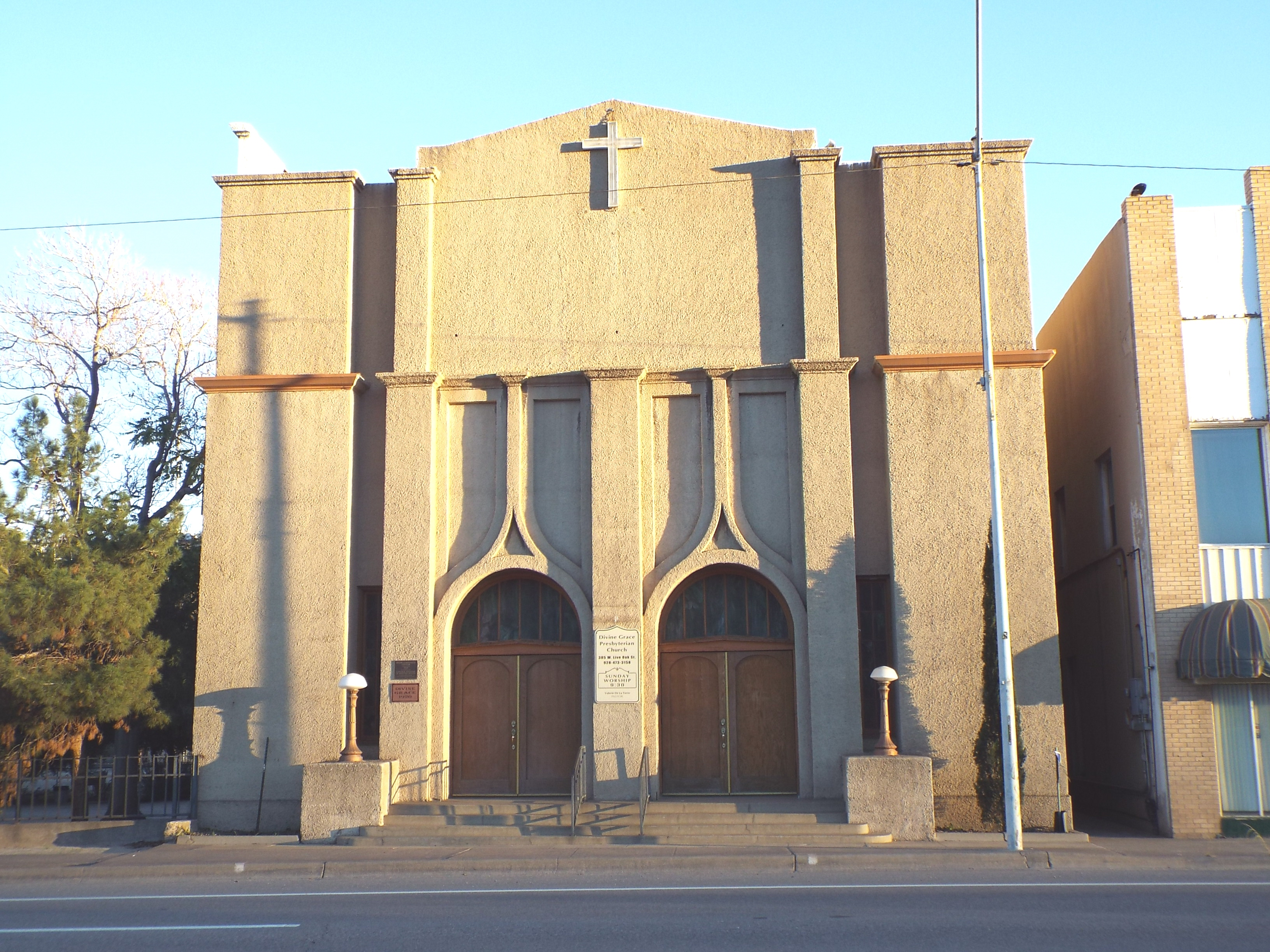
Miami Community Church

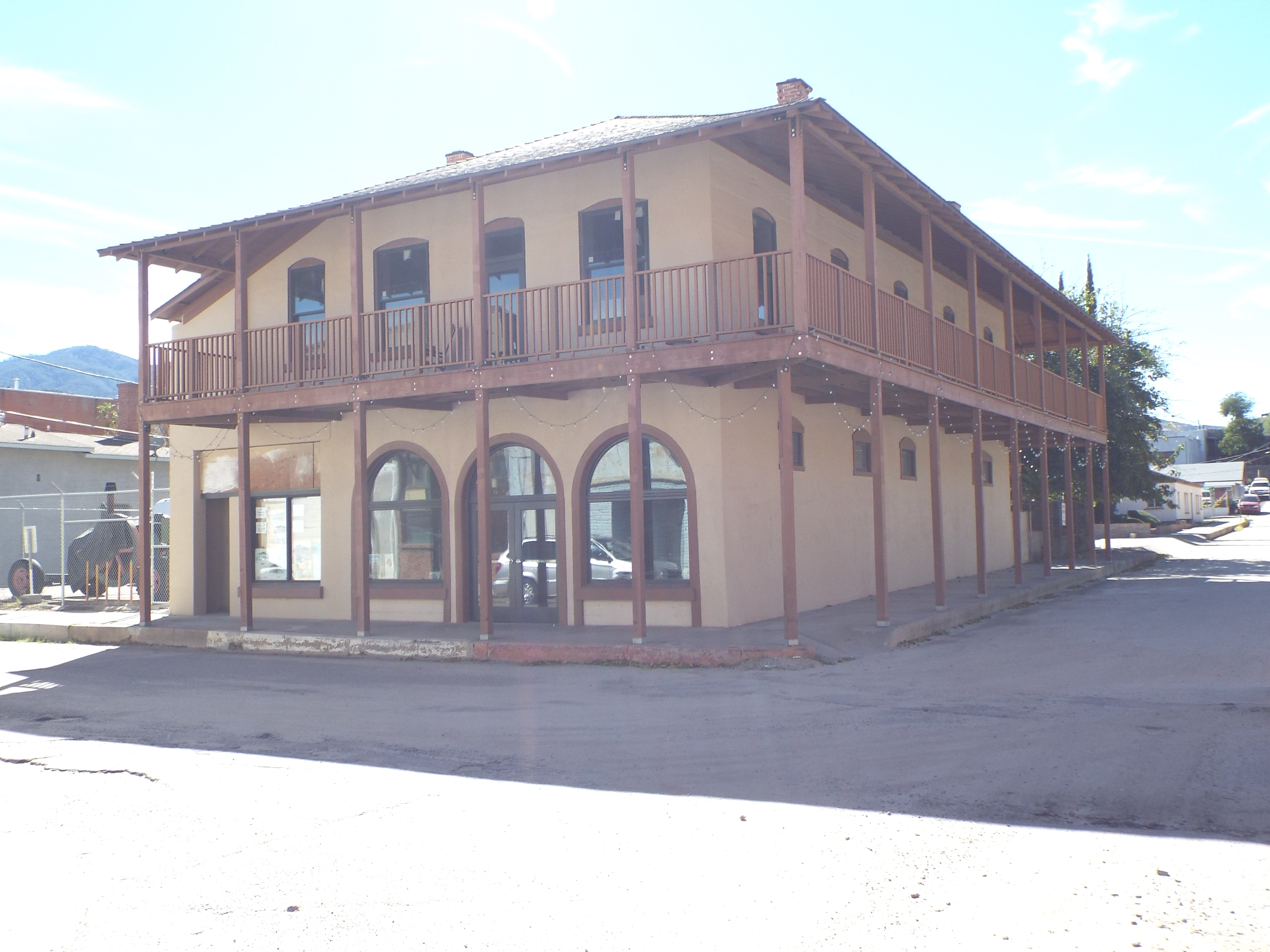
Fritzpatrick Building

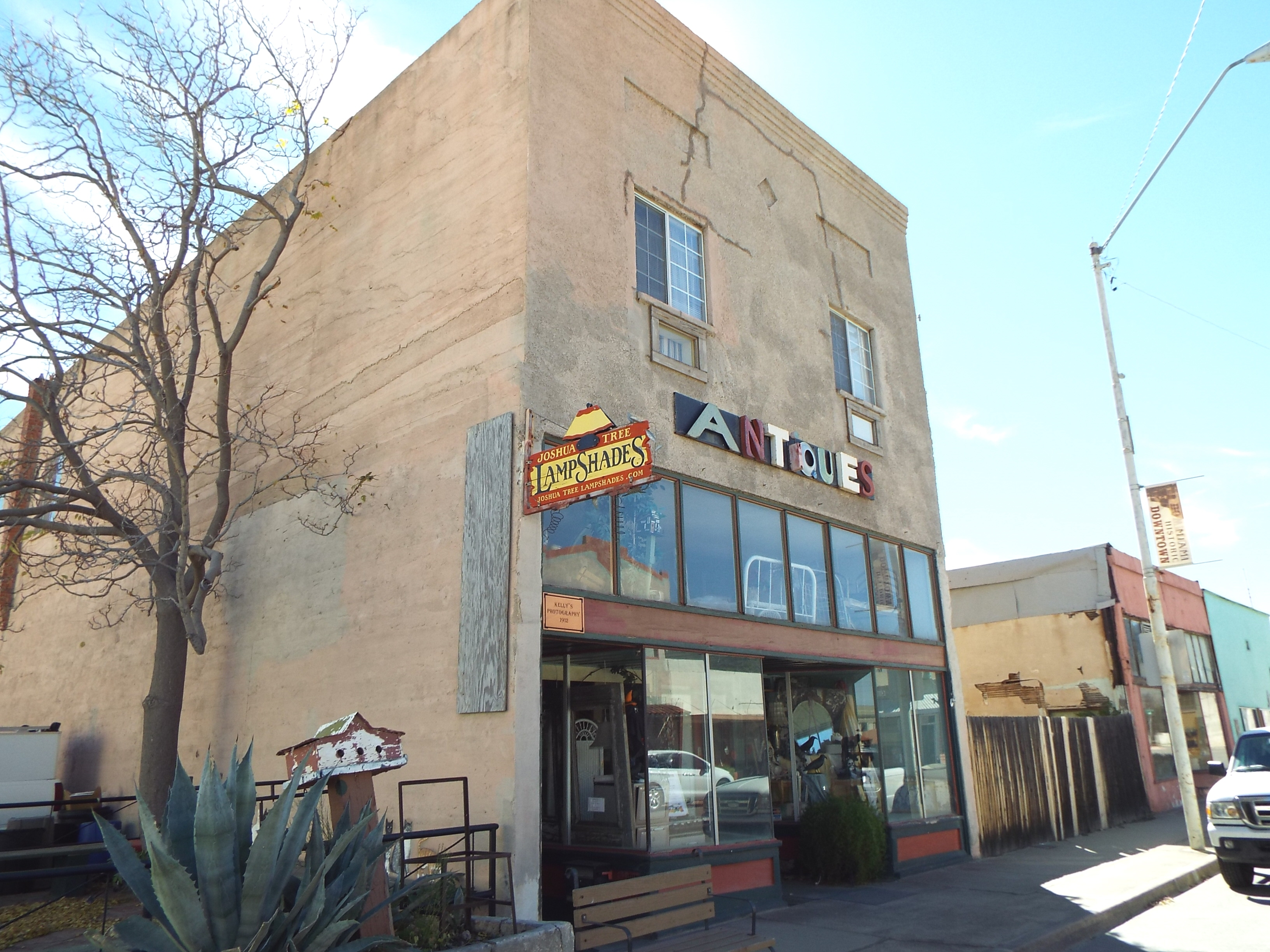
Kelly’s Photography Building

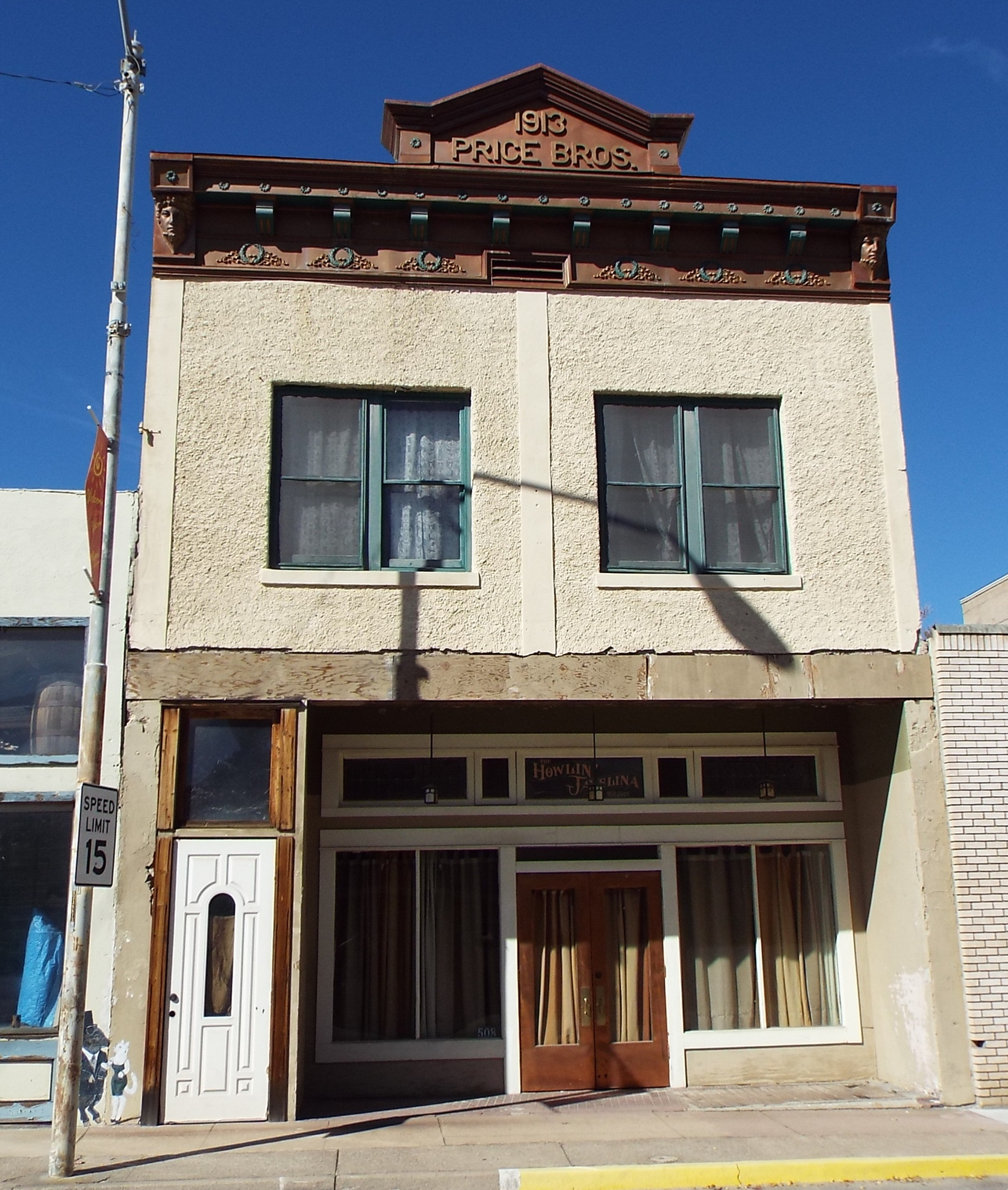
Price Brothers Building

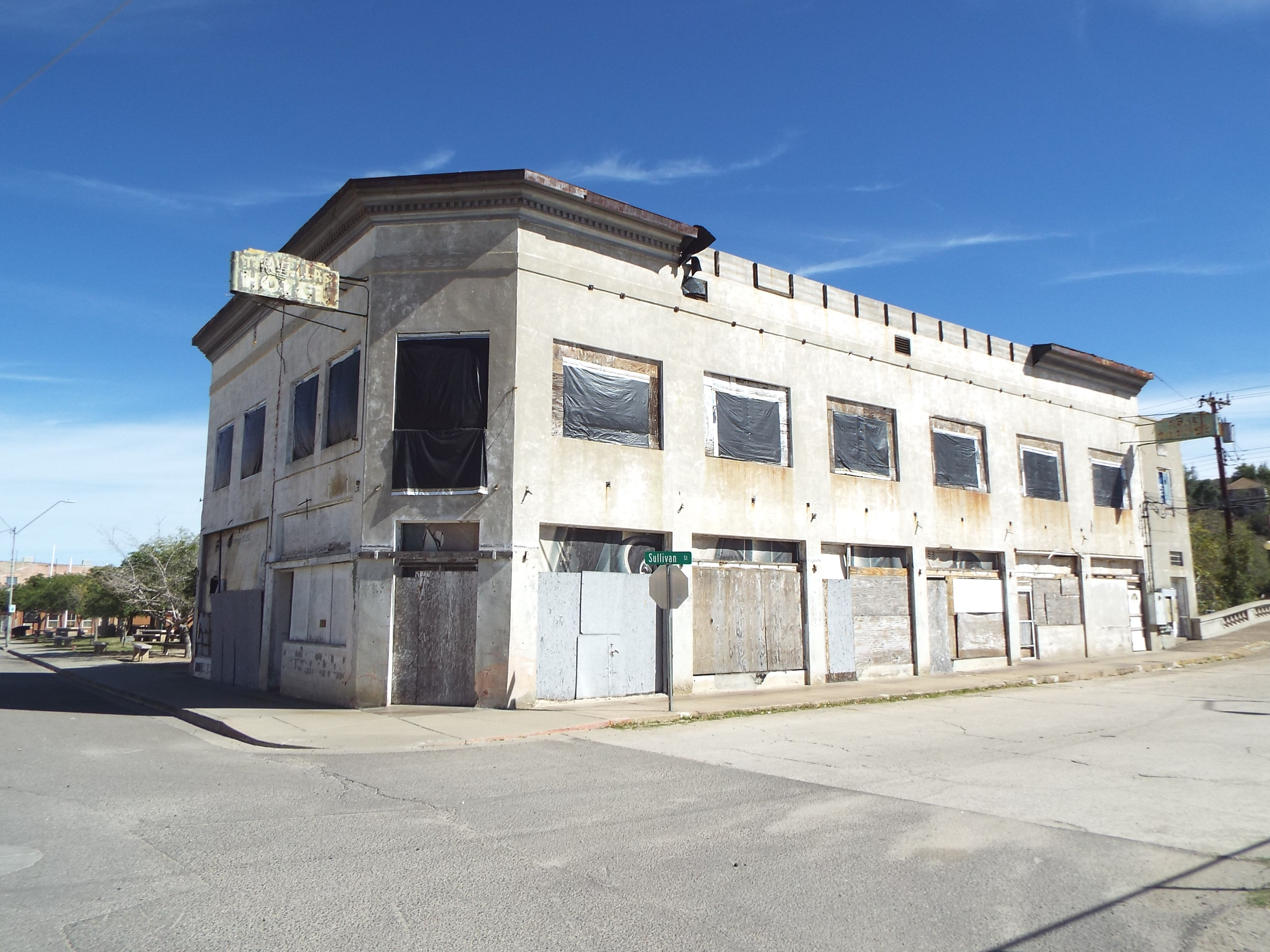
Travelers Hotel

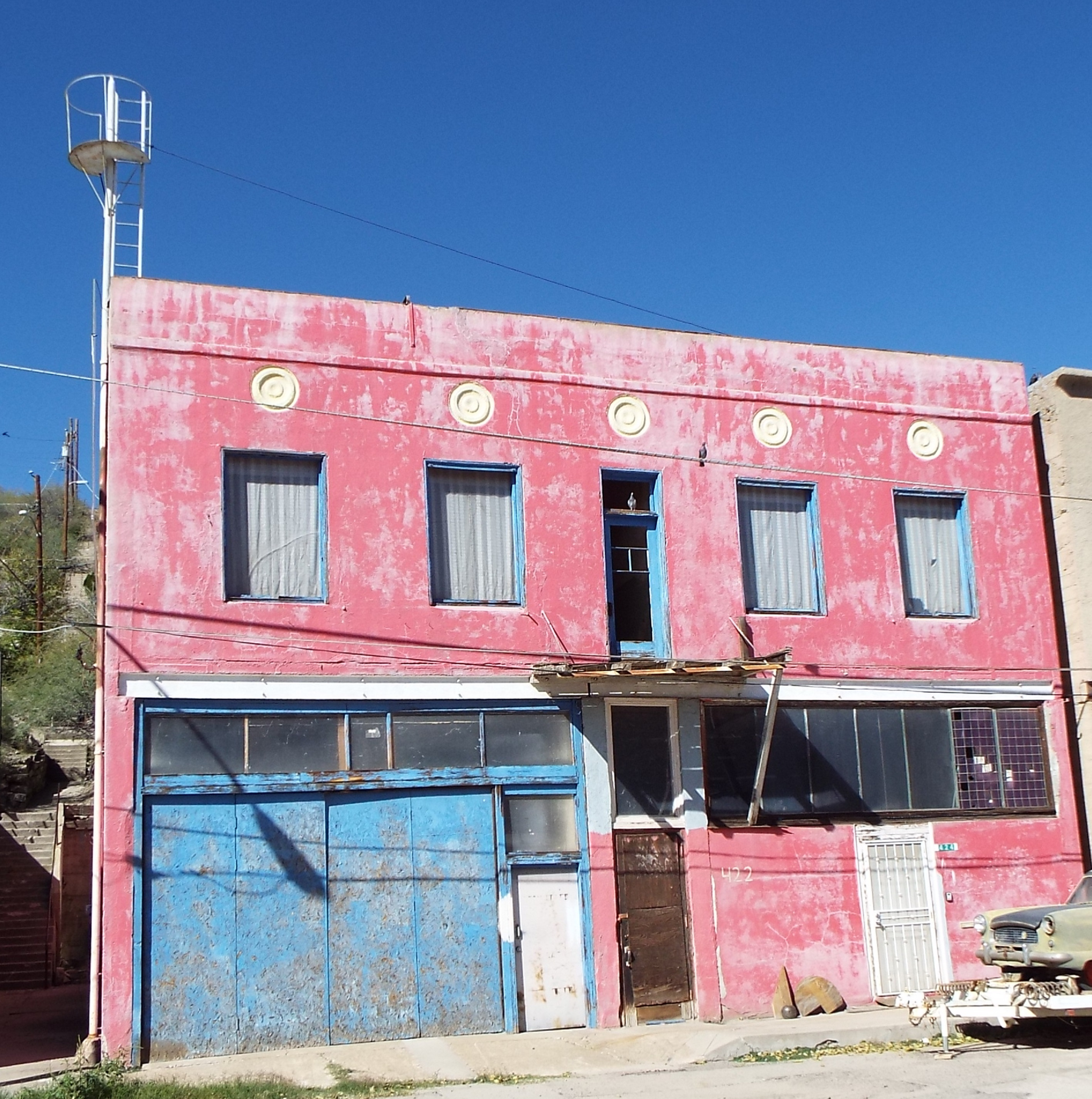
Firehouse Building

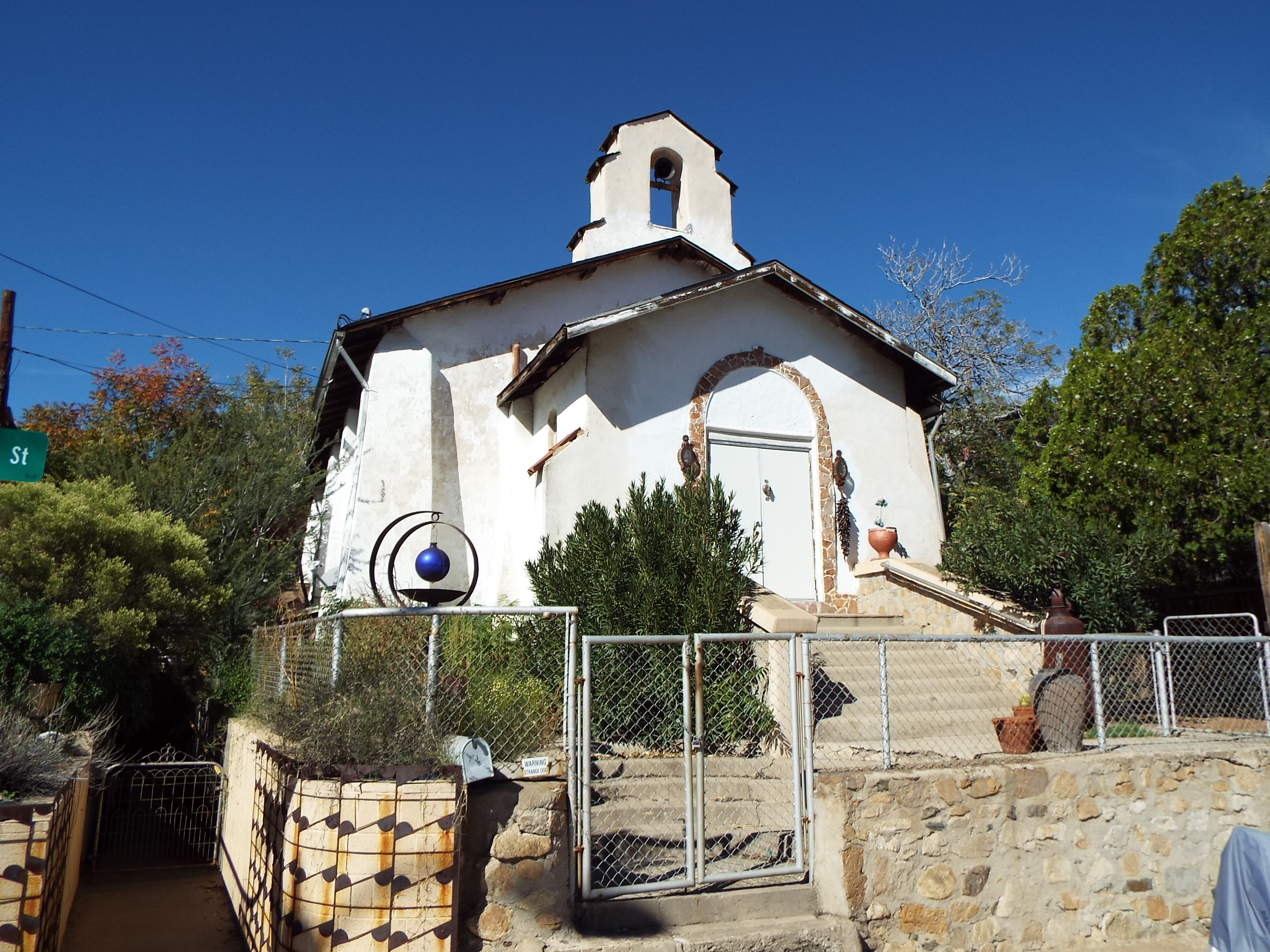
First Baptist Church

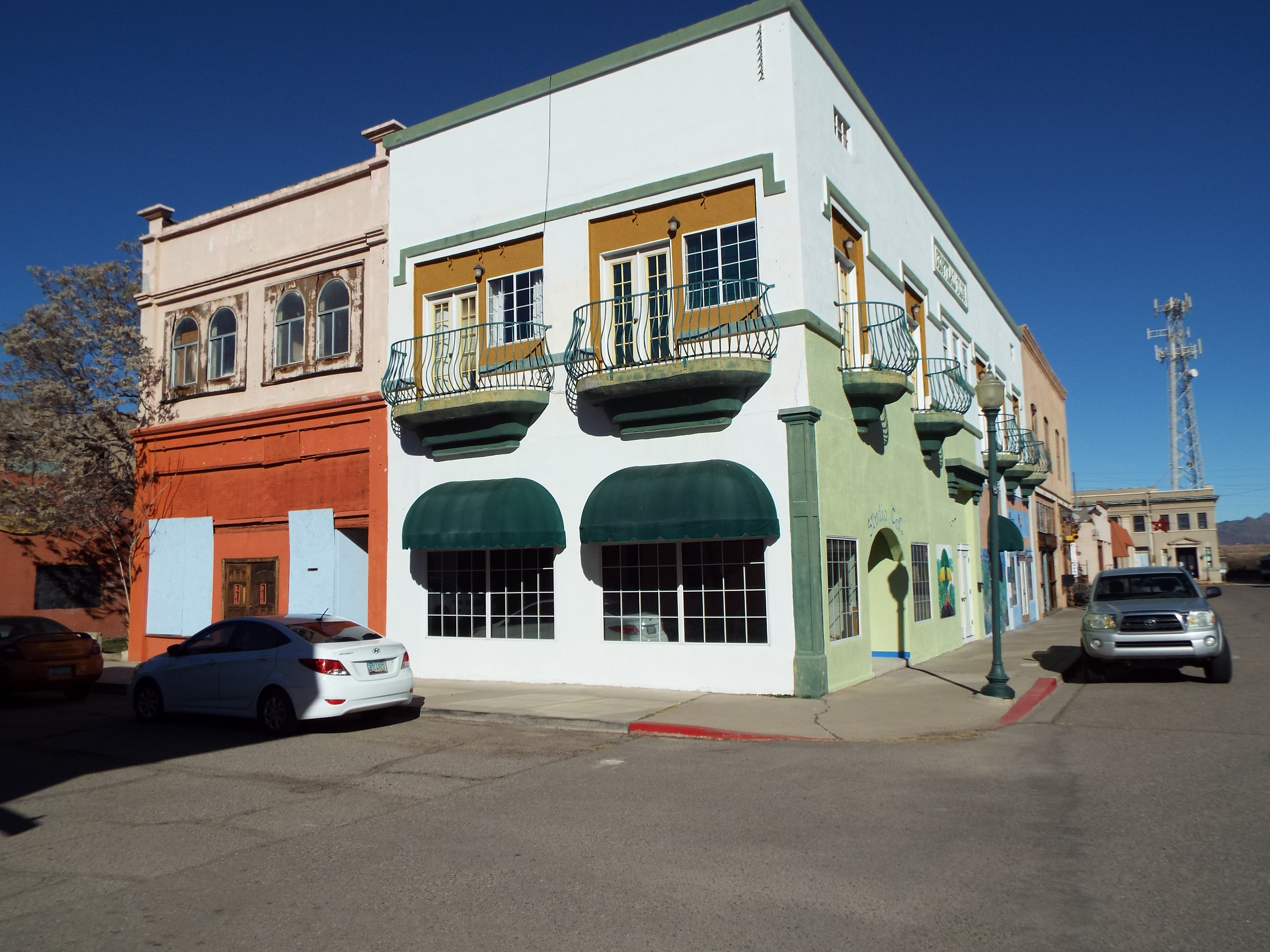
Bank of Miami

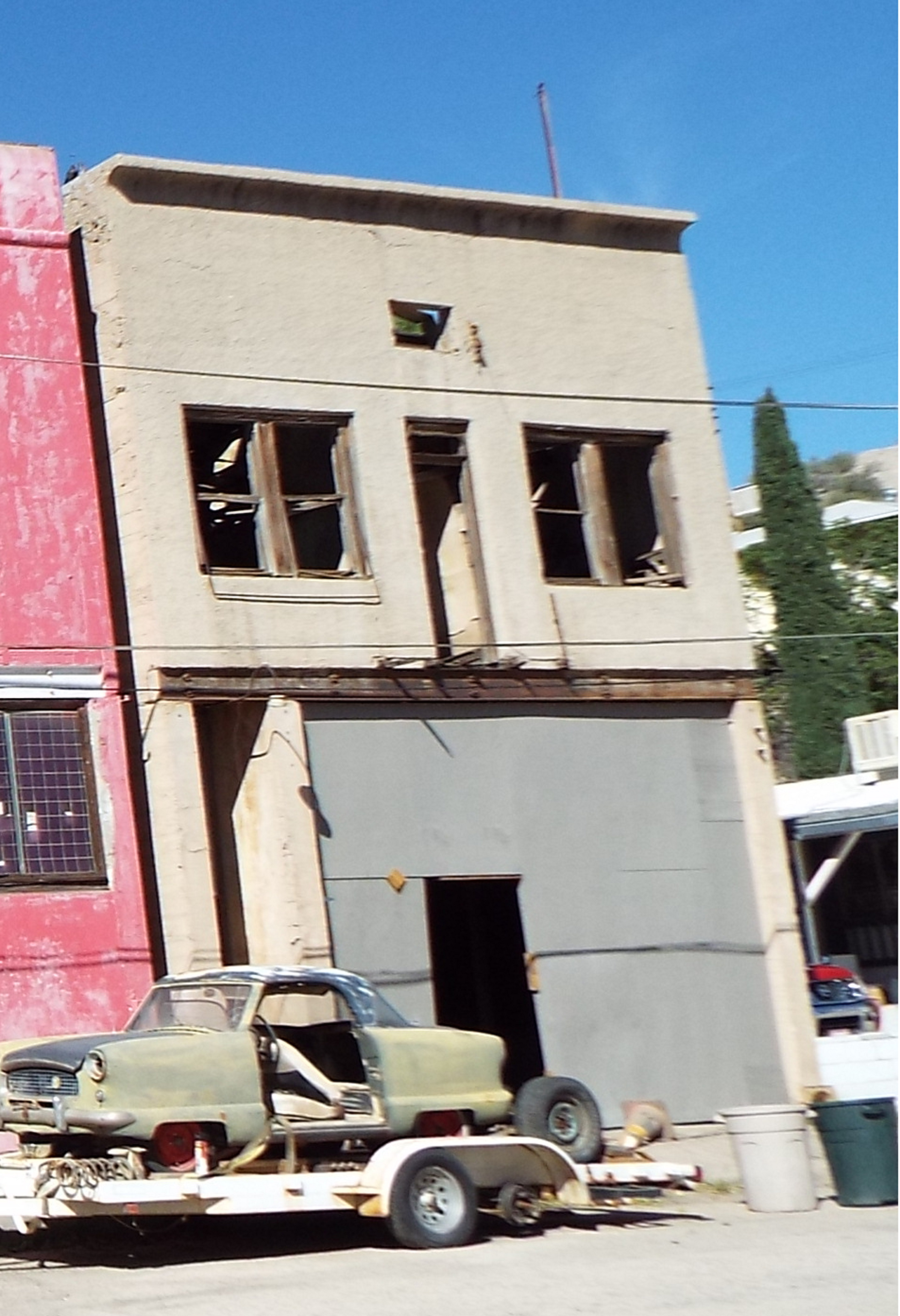
Cleaning and Pressing Shop

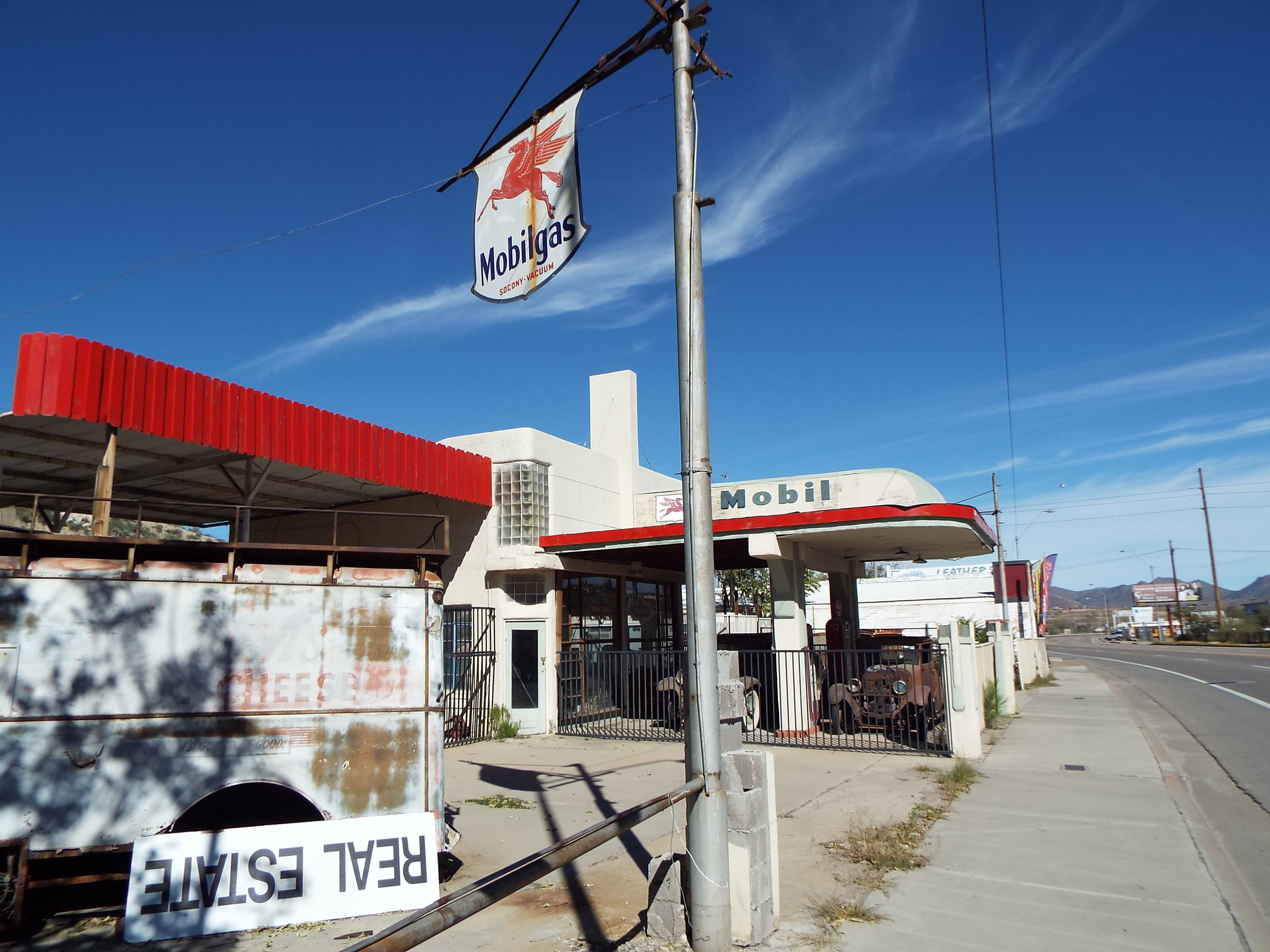
Mobil Gas Station

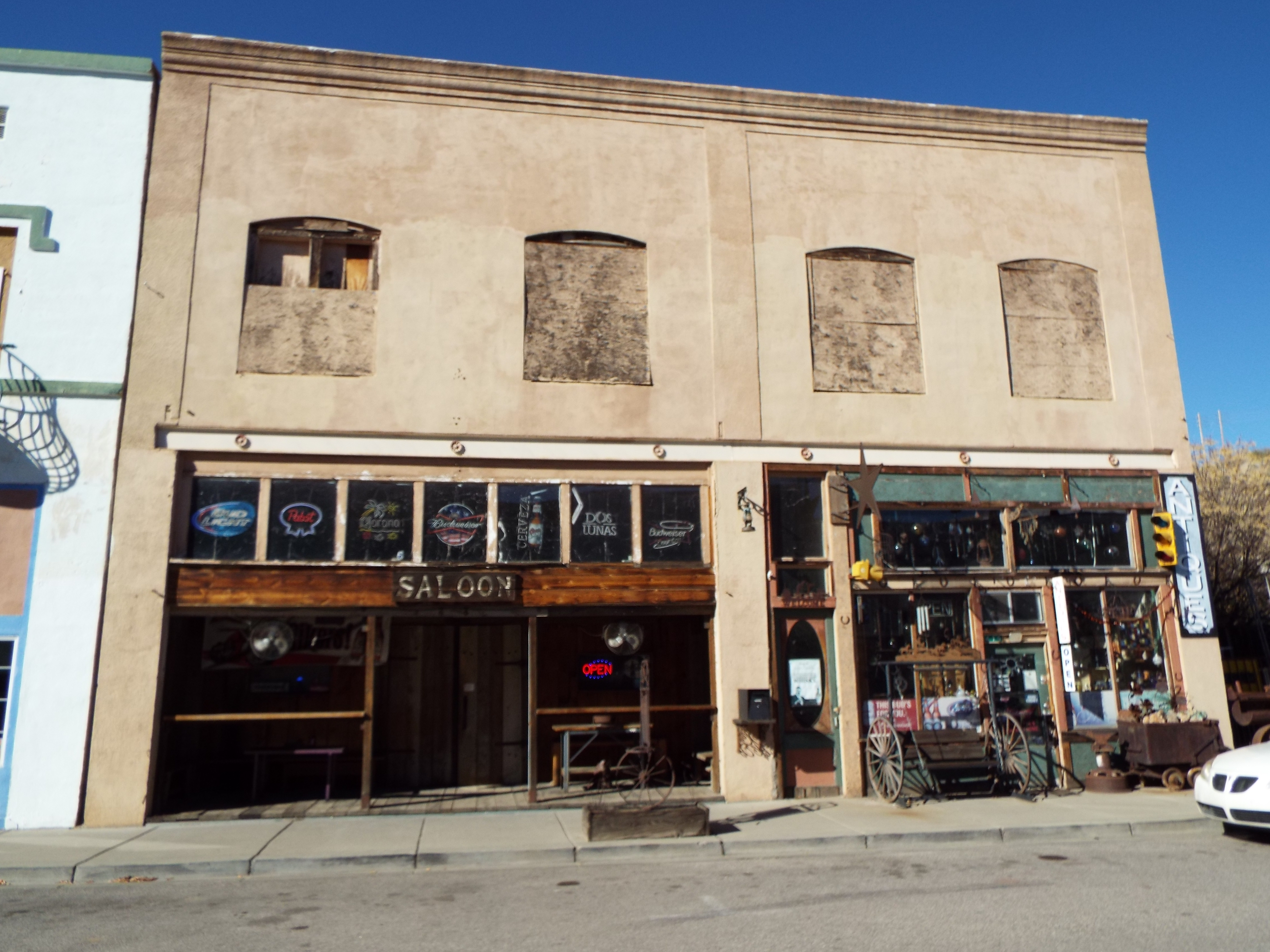
First two story building in Miami.

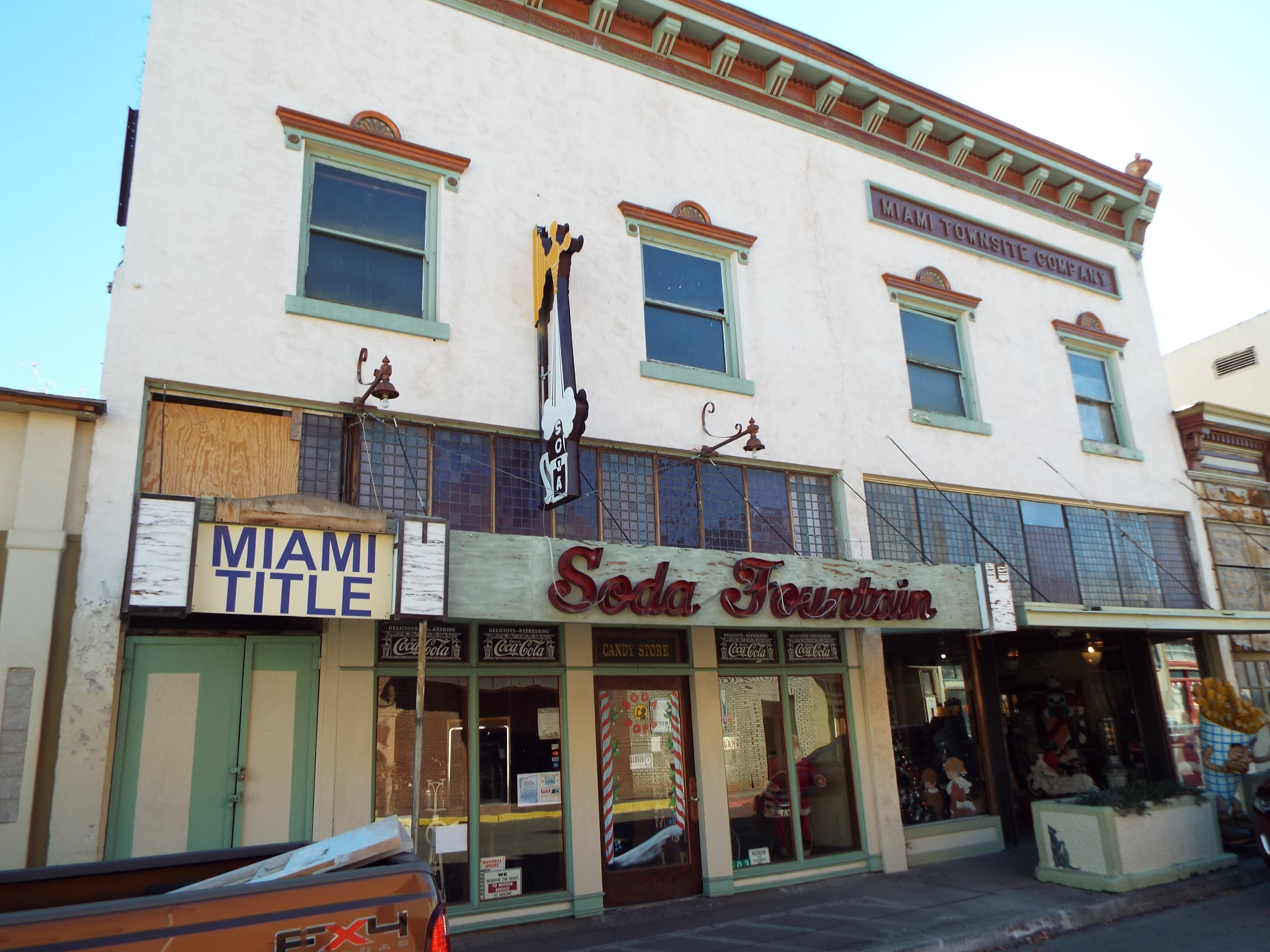
Miami Townsite building

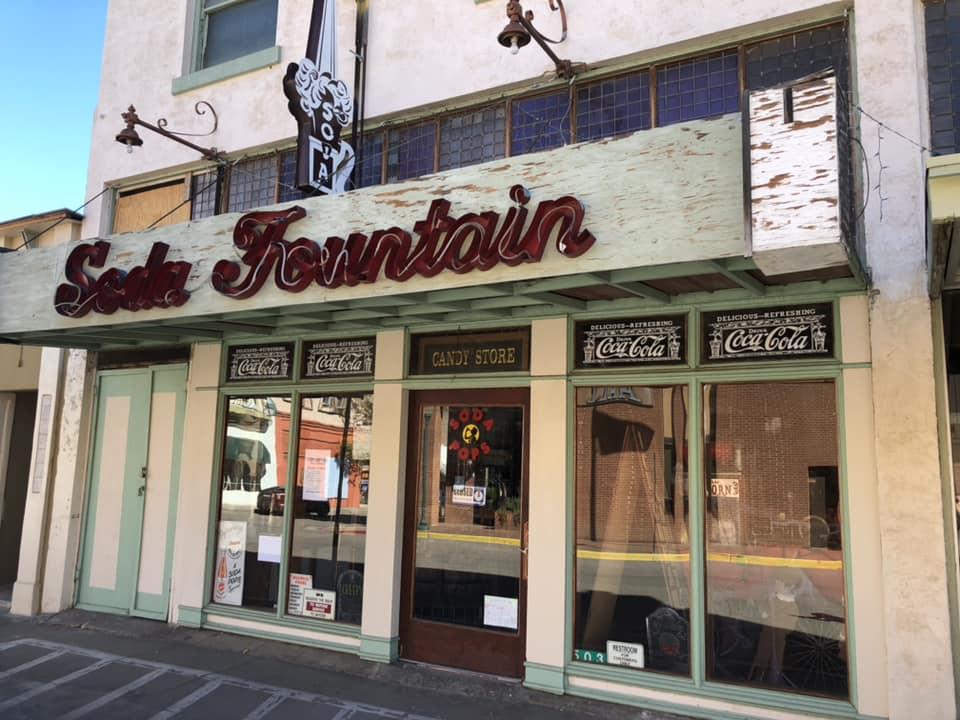
Miami Townsite building

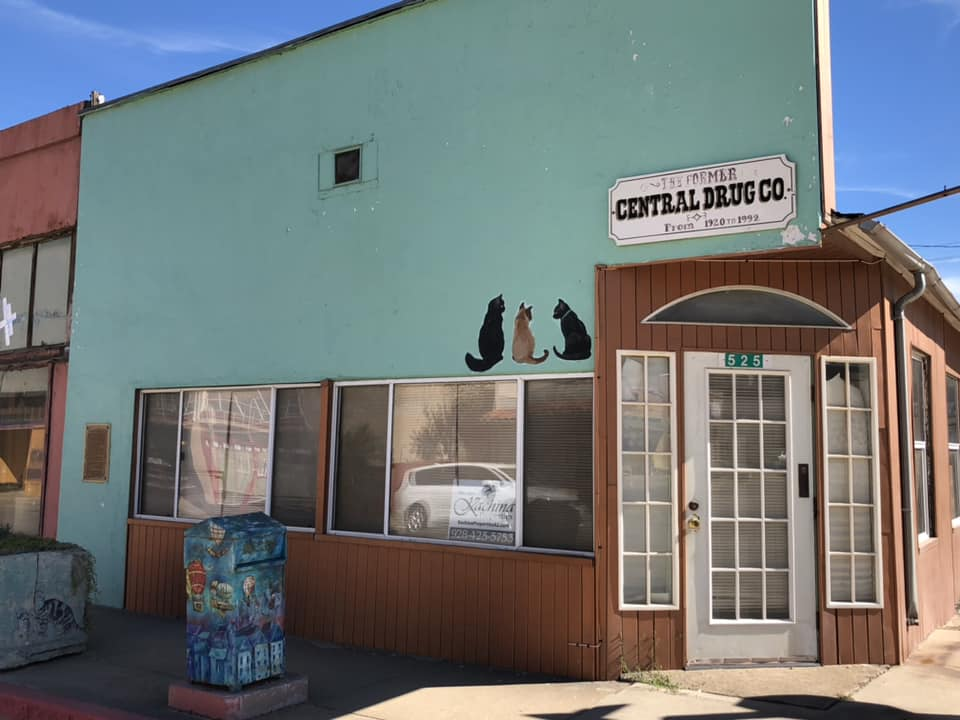
Central Drug Co.

== See also ==
- National Register of Historic Places listings in Pinal County, Arizona
