= Miami Community Church =

Historic church in Arizona, United States

- U.S. National Register of Historic Places
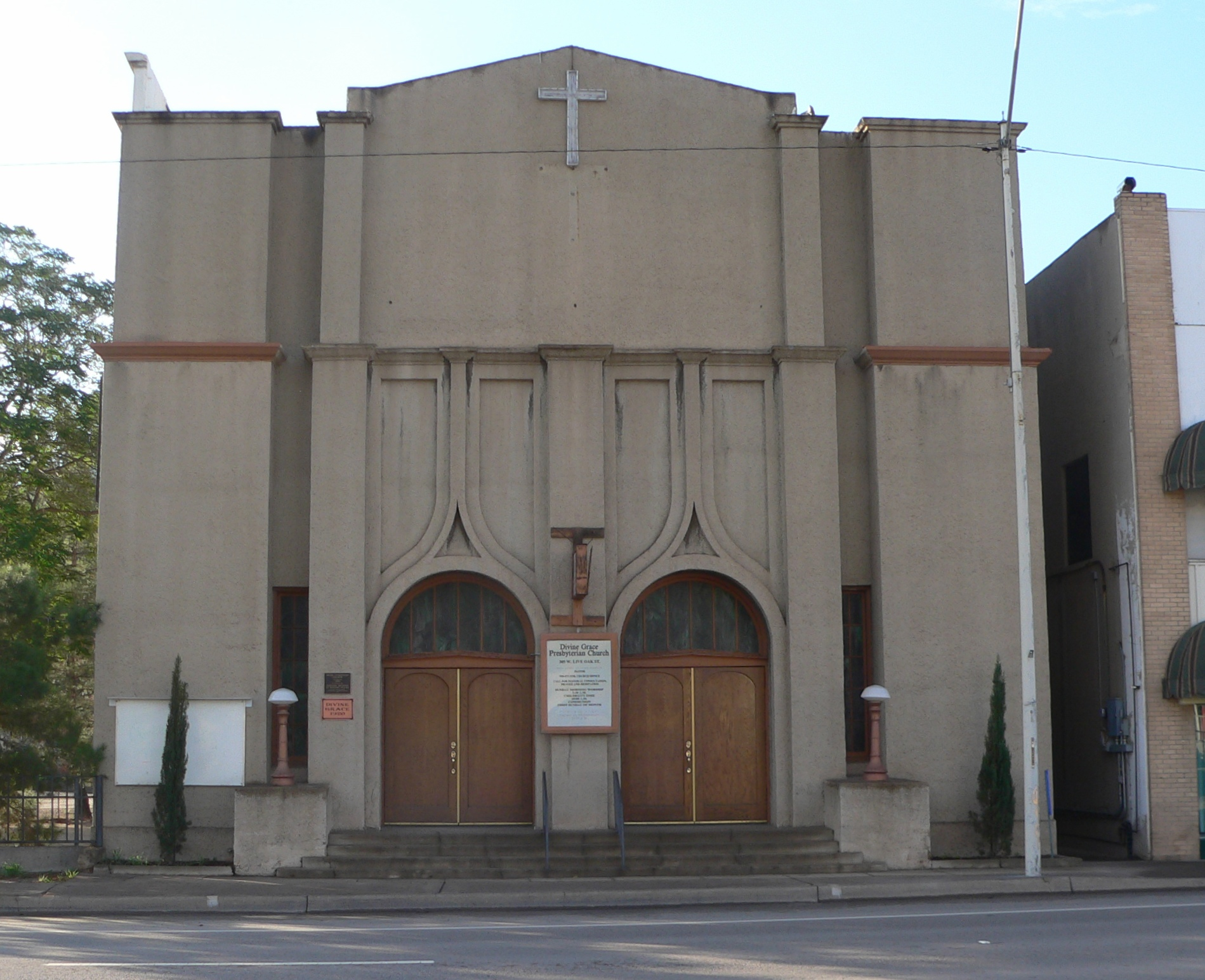

- Location within Arizona Location within the United States
- Location: 305 W. Live Oak St., Miami, Arizona
- Coordinates: 33°23′58.7″N 110°52′5.6″W
- Area: less than one acre
- Built: 1920
- Built by: Holburg & Burdick
- Architect: Trost & Trost
- NRHP reference No.: 05000137
- Added to NRHP: March 15, 2005

Miami Community Church (also known as Miami Presbyterian Church; Community Presbyterian Church; Divine Grace Presbyterian Church) is a church at 305 W. Live Oak Street in Miami, Arizona.

It was built in 1920 and added to the National Register of Historic Places in 2005.

== See also ==
- List of historic properties in Miami, Arizona
