= Talley (disambiguation) =

Talley is a village in Carmarthenshire, Wales.

Talley or Talleys may also refer to:

== Arts and entertainment ==
- A disfunctional family in Fifth of July, Talley's Folly, Talley & Son, three plays by Lanford Wilson
- The Talleys, an American musical group

== People ==
- Talley (surname)
- Talley Beatty (1918–1995), American choreographer

== Places ==
- Talley Abbey, Talley, Carmarthenshire, Wales
- Talley Lakes, Talley, Carmarthenshire, Wales

== Other uses ==
- Talley v. California, a 1960 US Supreme Court case
- Talley's Group, a New Zealand agribusiness
- Talley Vineyards, a California wine estate

=== See also ===
- Tally (disambiguation)
- William Talley House (disambiguation), multiple houses
