= List of historic properties in Safford, Arizona =

- City
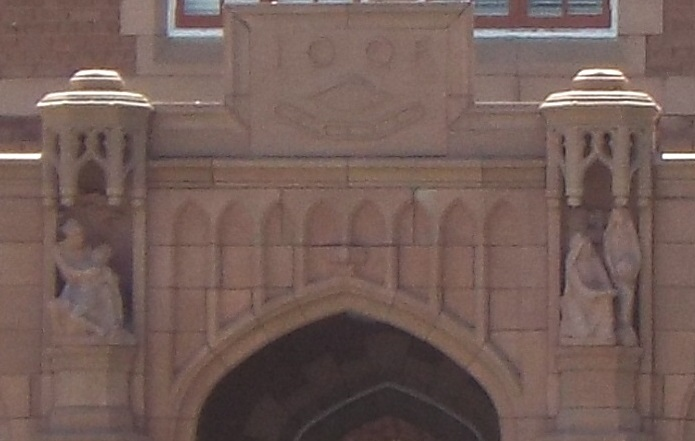
- Details of the Oddfellows Home entrance

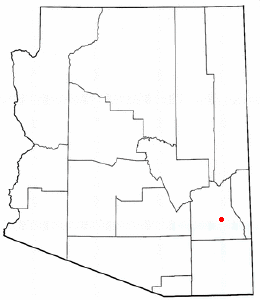
- Location of Safford in Arizona
- Coordinates: 32°49′24″N 109°42′53″W

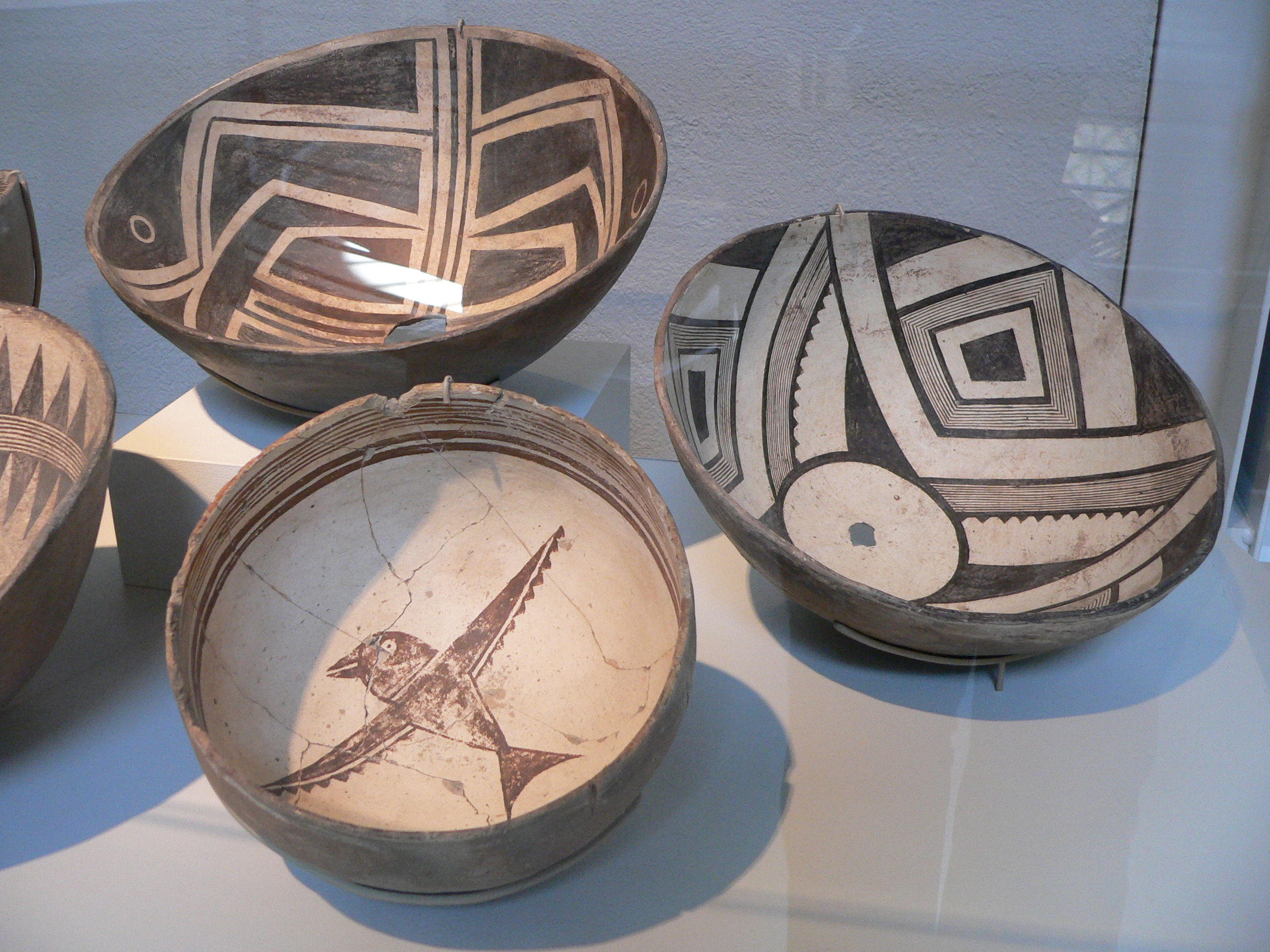
Mimbres bowls at Stanford University

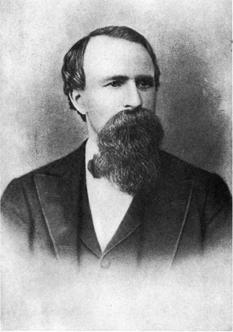
Anson Safford

This is a list, which includes a photographic gallery, of some of the remaining historic buildings, houses, structures and monuments in Safford, Arizona, a City in Graham County. Some are listed in the National Register of Historic Places (NRHP). Safford also has two archeological districts, whose access are restricted, a Campsite and Trail, plus the Columbine Work Station State in the Coronado National Forest, which are not in the city but within its boundaries and which are listed in the National Register of Historic Places.

== Brief history ==
According to archaeologist the area where Safford is located was once inhabited by Mimbre people, an ancient Native-American tribe of New Mexico, during the eleventh or twelfth centuries. They came to this conclusion after dating to that time the ceramic sherds which were discovered and which were decorated in the same manner as the ceramics made in the Mimbres heartland. Native-American burial grounds, village sites, and sacred sites have been found in this area.

The area came under Spanish rule ib what Spain claimed was New Spain. In the 1500s, the Spanish Conquistadores passed through the area while searching for the Seven Cities of Cibola, whose streets were supposed to be paved with gold. Many of them stayed in Pueblo Viejo on the slopes of "Dził Nchaa Sí'an" (Big Seated Mountain), as Mt. Graham was then known.

In 1846, the United States declared war against Mexico in what became known as the Mexican–American War. During the conflict General Stephen Watts Kearney led the Army of the West into the area. With him was Lieutenant William Emory, a topographer and scientist for the group. The Lieutenant referred to Mountain "Dził Nchaa Sí'an" as Mount Graham in his journal and on the map . Lieutenant Colonel Graham, a senior officer in the Army Corps of Topographical Engineers, who was his friend. This was the first Arizona county to break the tradition of naming counties for Native Americans. The conflict with Mexico ended in 1848.

In 1854, the United States purchased the region from Mexico in what is known as the Gadsden Purchase. Americans of European descent from the East Coast of the United States began to arrive in the area. Among the early pioneers were members of the Church of Jesus Christ of Latter-day Saints. The Mormon settlers brought with them brick making skills and the tradition of building brick dwellings.

In the winter of 1873, a group of settlers arrived in Pueblo Viejo with the intention of building dams and canals which would provide water to the area. They were joined by a few others they laid out the present town-site where they had established their camp under the town-site laws of the United States. After building a few buildings they named their town Safford after Anson Pacely Killen Safford, the third Governor of Arizona Territory, who always took an interest in the development of the area.

By the early 1880s, settlers came to the area in large numbers. They found that the trees in the nearby mountains provided lumbering materials for building as well as employment for the growing communities in the area. Safford became the county seat of Graham County. In 1883, part of the adobe courthouse in Safford collapsed. I. E. Solomon, who was a merchant and an Arizona Territorial legislator, and Peter Bolan proposed the building of a new and better courthouse in Solomonville. Solomonville, therefore became the county seat of Graham County. The railroad arrived in Safford in 1895 and brought dimensioned lumber and manufactured building materials to the community. Safford grew while Solomonville didn't. On June 28, 1915, the voters returned the county seat to Safford. The Town of Safford was incorporated October 10, 1901, and changed to City of Safford in 1955.

== Historical Graham County Association ==
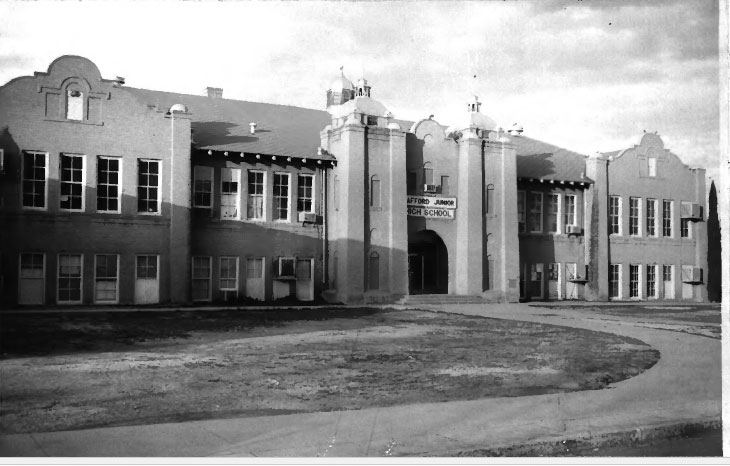
Old Safford High School (1915)

According to the Historical Graham County Association their mission is to obtain and secure oral and written history of Graham County and its citizens and occupants as well as artifacts reflecting that history, to securely maintain and preserve and present said material, in order that present and future citizens and visitors may have an understanding and appreciation of the county, the people who live and have lived here, and the county's place in history.

A property may be listed in the National Register of Historic Places or it may be eligible to be listed as such, however that does not mean that the property is safe from being demolished by its owner. According to Jim McPherson, Arizona Preservation Foundation Board President:

"It is crucial that residents, private interests, and government officials act now to save these elements of our cultural heritage before it is too late."

An example is the Old Safford High School which was built in 1915 and located at 520 11th Street. This property was listed in the National Register of Historic Places on February 9, 1988, reference: #87002577. Yet, the building was demolished in 2007.

Another historical building that was demolished was the Buena Vista Hotel. The hotel was built in 1928 and located at 322 Main Street. It was listed in the National Register of Historic Places on February 9, 1988, reference: #87002560. However, unlike the Safford High School a fire damaged part of the interior of the building in 1979, and as such the remainder of the building was demolished.

== Historic buildings ==
The following is a brief description of some of the historic buildings in Safford

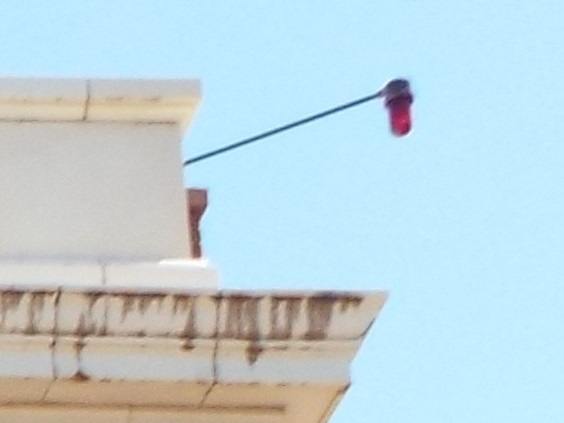
The Arizona Bank and Trust rod and light

- Arizona Bank and Trust – built in 1920 and located at 429 Main Street. According to its NRHP marker: "on May 28, 1921, the general public was invited to view the fine interior. It featured gray marble, oak cabinets and facilities that included storage vaults, safety deposit boxes and rooms for patrons to conduct business. The depression caused the Arizona Bank & Trust to close its offices in Safford, Pima and Thatcher late in 1923. The upper northwest corner still boasts its rod and light. Before radios were invented, this was used to notify the local police officer that he was needed at the station." Listed in the National Register of Historic Place on February 9, 1988, reference: #87002557.
- Oddfellows Home – built in 1921 and located at 808 8th Ave. The building underwent a restoration and parts of the ornamental statuary were recast and restored. Today it is part of the city of Safford office complex. Listed in the National Register of Historic Place on May 12, 1988, reference: #87002571.
- Southern Pacific Railroad Depot – built in 1928 and located at 808 Central Avenue. Architectural styles: Late 19th and 20th Century Revival: Mission/Spanish Revival; Other architectural type; Spanish Colonial Revival. Listed in the National Register of Historic Place on February 9, 1988, reference: #87002578.
- Woman's Club – built in 1930 and located at 215 Main Street. The club was first established as "The Improvement Club," whose main focus was on the cleanup of local streets and yards. The club is now officially known as the "GFWC Woman's Club of Safford". The GFWC stands for General Federation of Women's Club. Listed in the National Register of Historic Place on May 12, 1988, reference: #87002586.
- Graham County Courthouse – built in 1916 and located at 800 Main Street. J. A. McAllister, a justice in the Arizona Supreme Court, and Jesse A. Udall, a Chief Justice of the Arizona Supreme Court, began their careers here. The building was listed in the National Register of Historic Place on May 25, 1982, reference: #82002077.
- North Ward School – built in 1898 and located at 717 West Main Street. Originally the North Ward School, the bids to build the building were opened in February 1898 and the contract was awarded to R. A. Smith Jr. and John Morris. The building, whose total cost was $5,400, was ready for the fall term in September of that year. This structure, though historical, is not listed on the National Register of Historic Places because of the significant renovations which were made. The building now serves as the Safford City Hall
- Commercial Store – built in 1895 and located on 501 W Main St
- Cobbs Market – built in 1904 and located on 430 W. Main St.
- Warner's Drug Store – built in 1904 – This drug store was owned by H.J. Warner, a physician and pharmacist.
- Safford Theater – built in 1911 – The theater, established by Thomas Malcolm, began as an Airdrome Theater. On September 6, 1913, the theater showed its first talking movie.
- B.F. Thum Dry Goods Store – built in 1920 and located on 418 W. Main St. – The owner of the building, B.F. Thum, served as city clerk and treasurer. The building later housed a Plumbing and Heating business
- Lewis Building – built in 1877 – The building once belonged to Joshua Bailey a.k.a. the "Father of Safford".

== Historic buildings pictured ==
The following are the images of the historic buildings in Safford.

Historic buildings
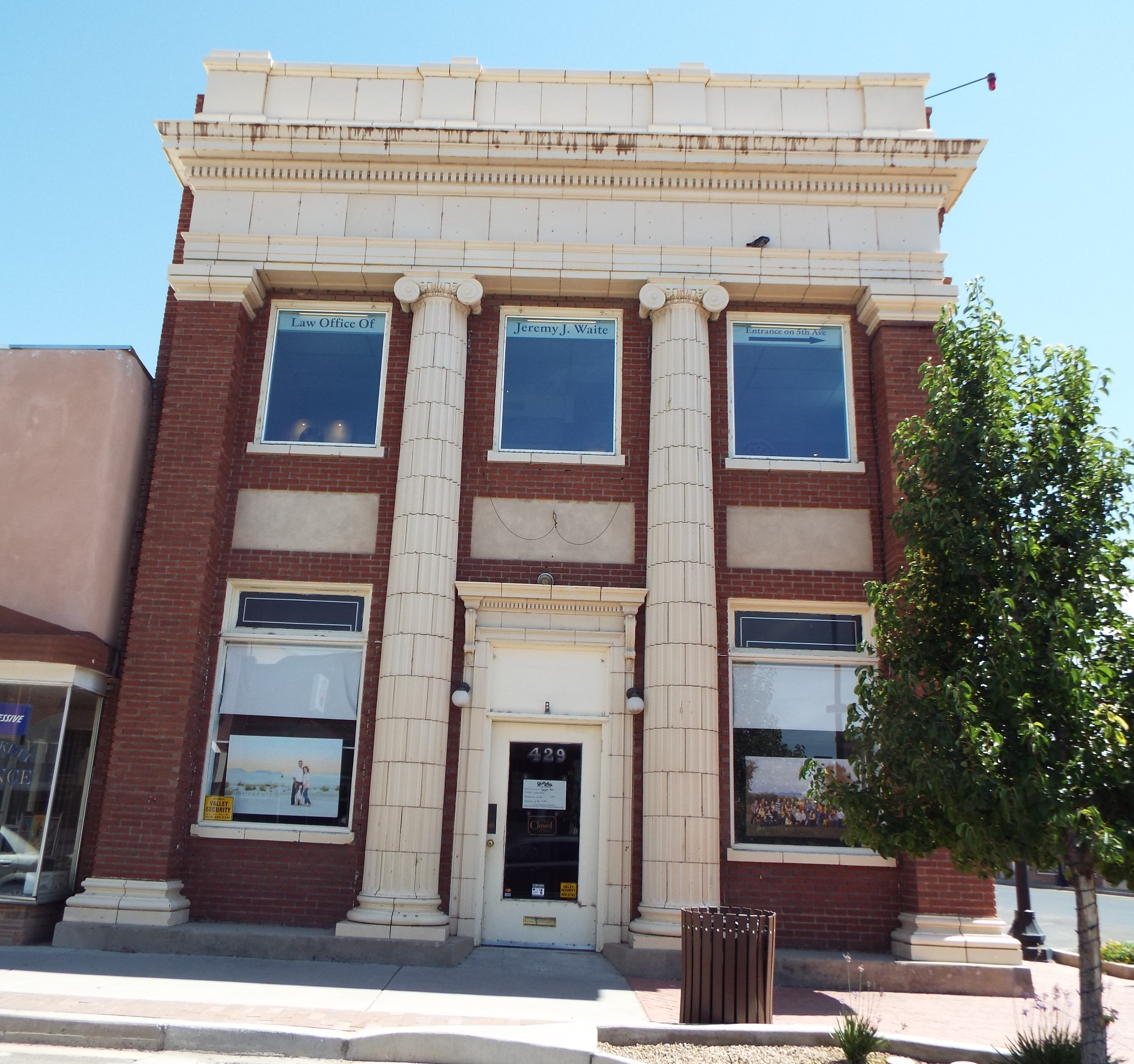
Arizona Bank and Trust – 1920

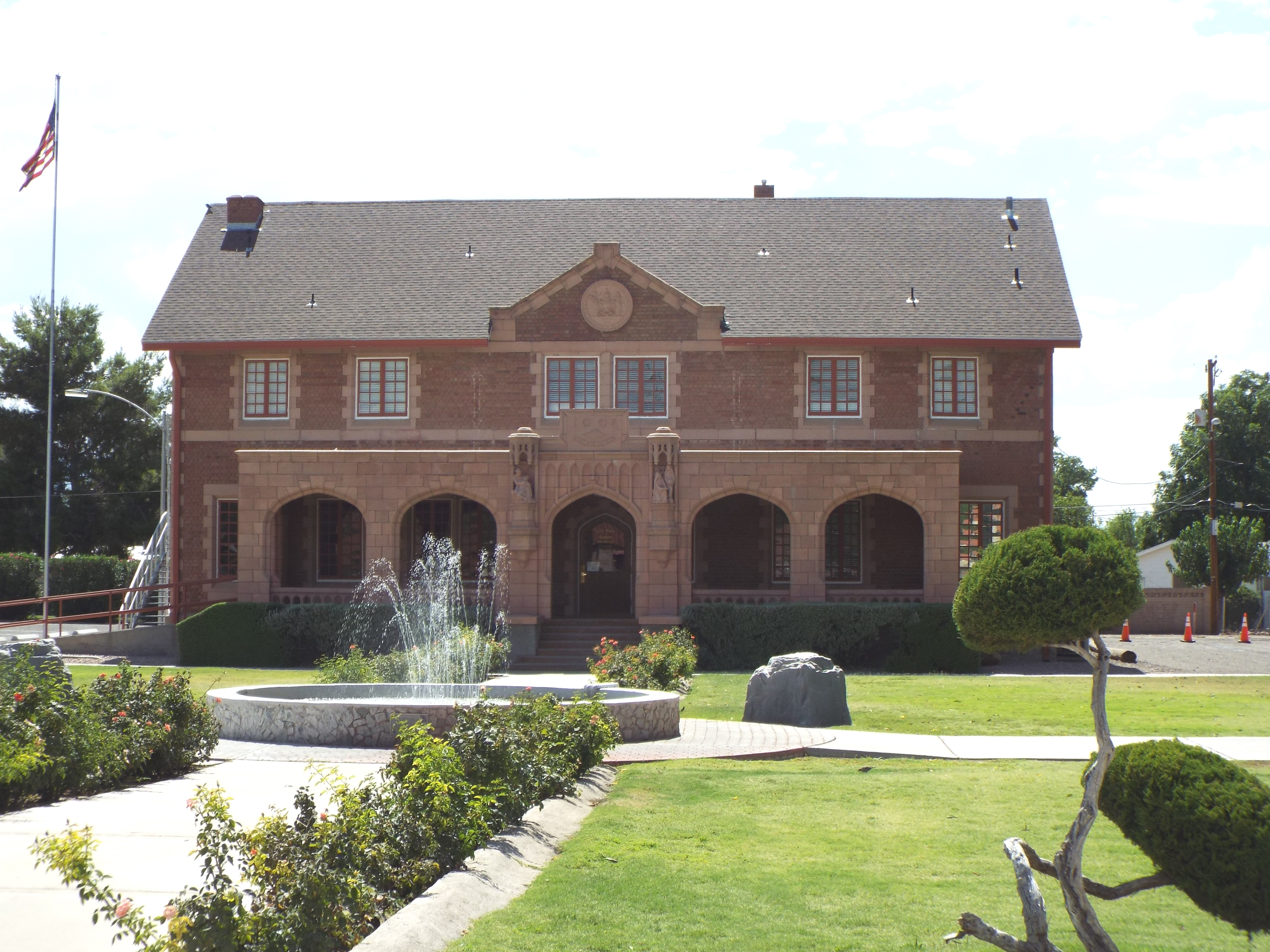
Oddfellows Home – 1921

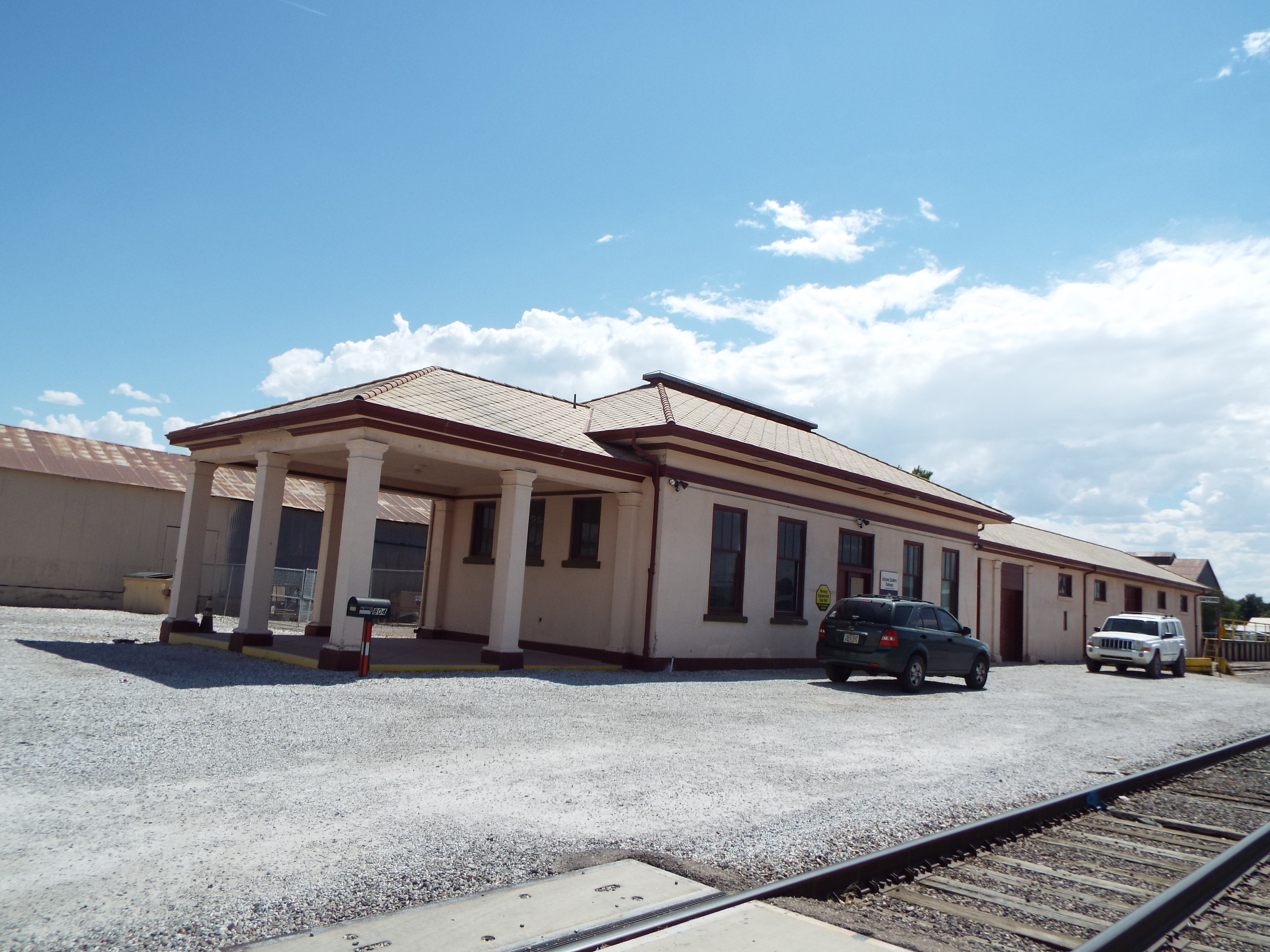
Southern Pacific Railroad Depot – 1928

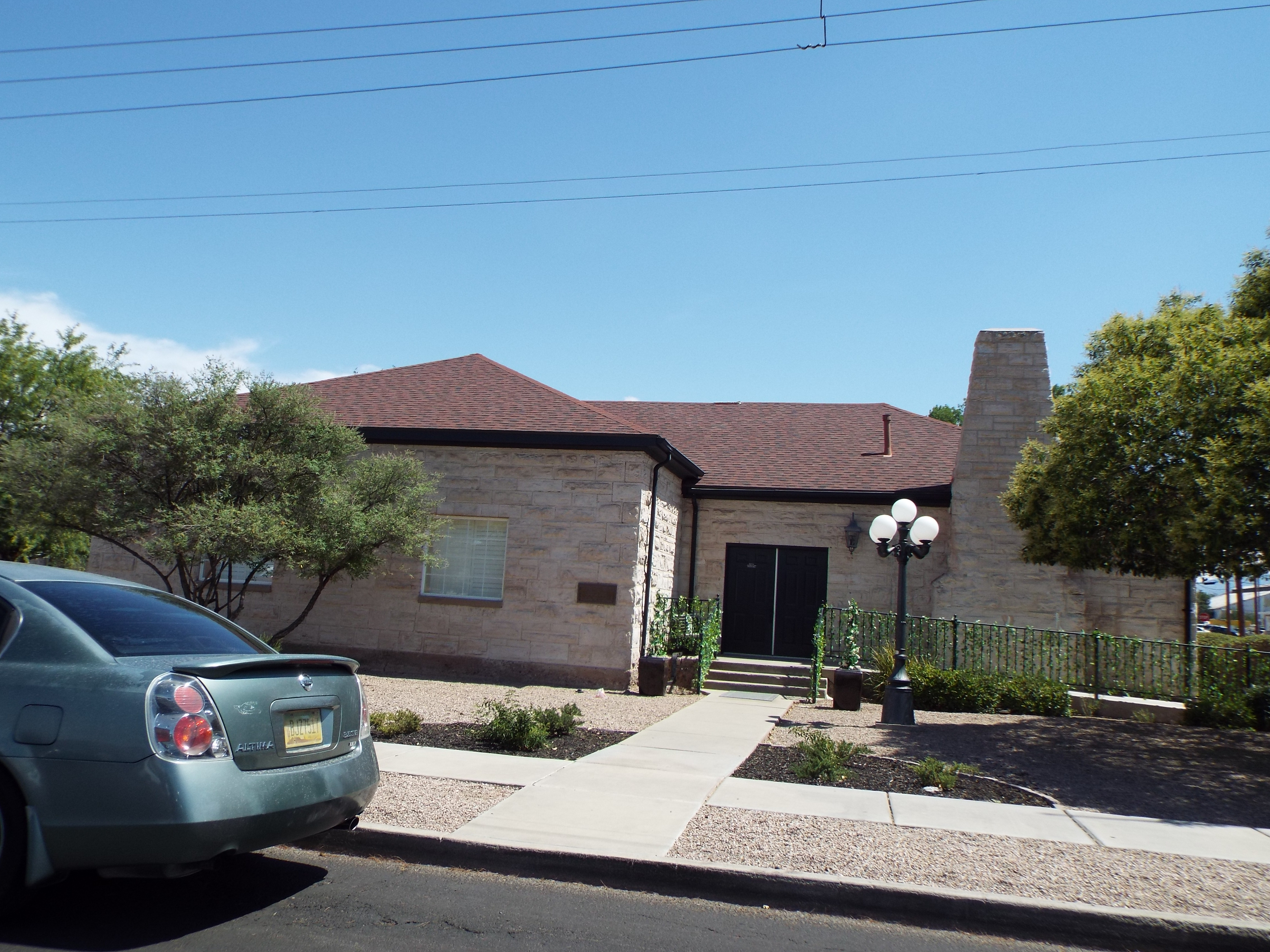
Woman's Club – 1930

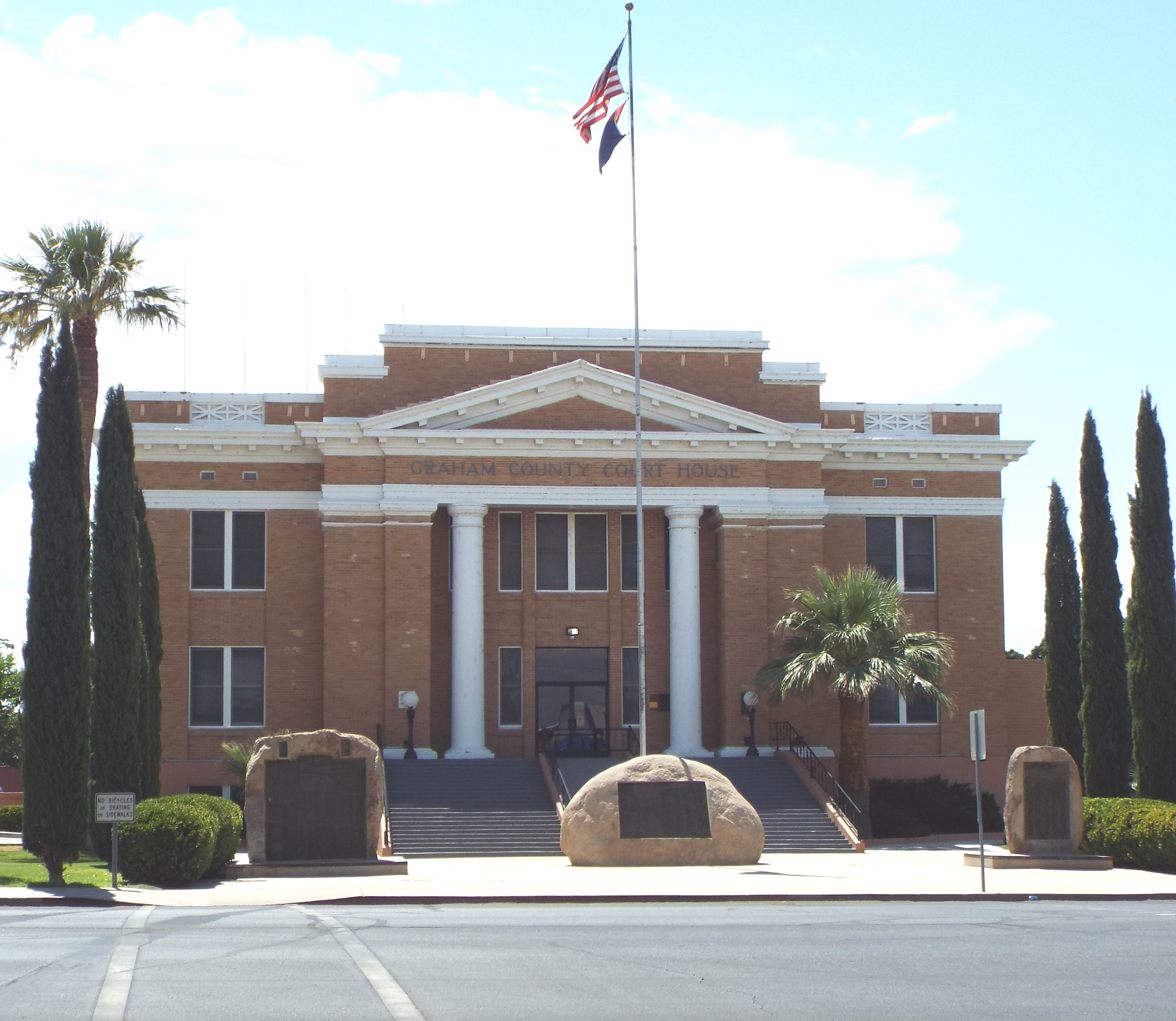
Graham County Courthouse – 1916

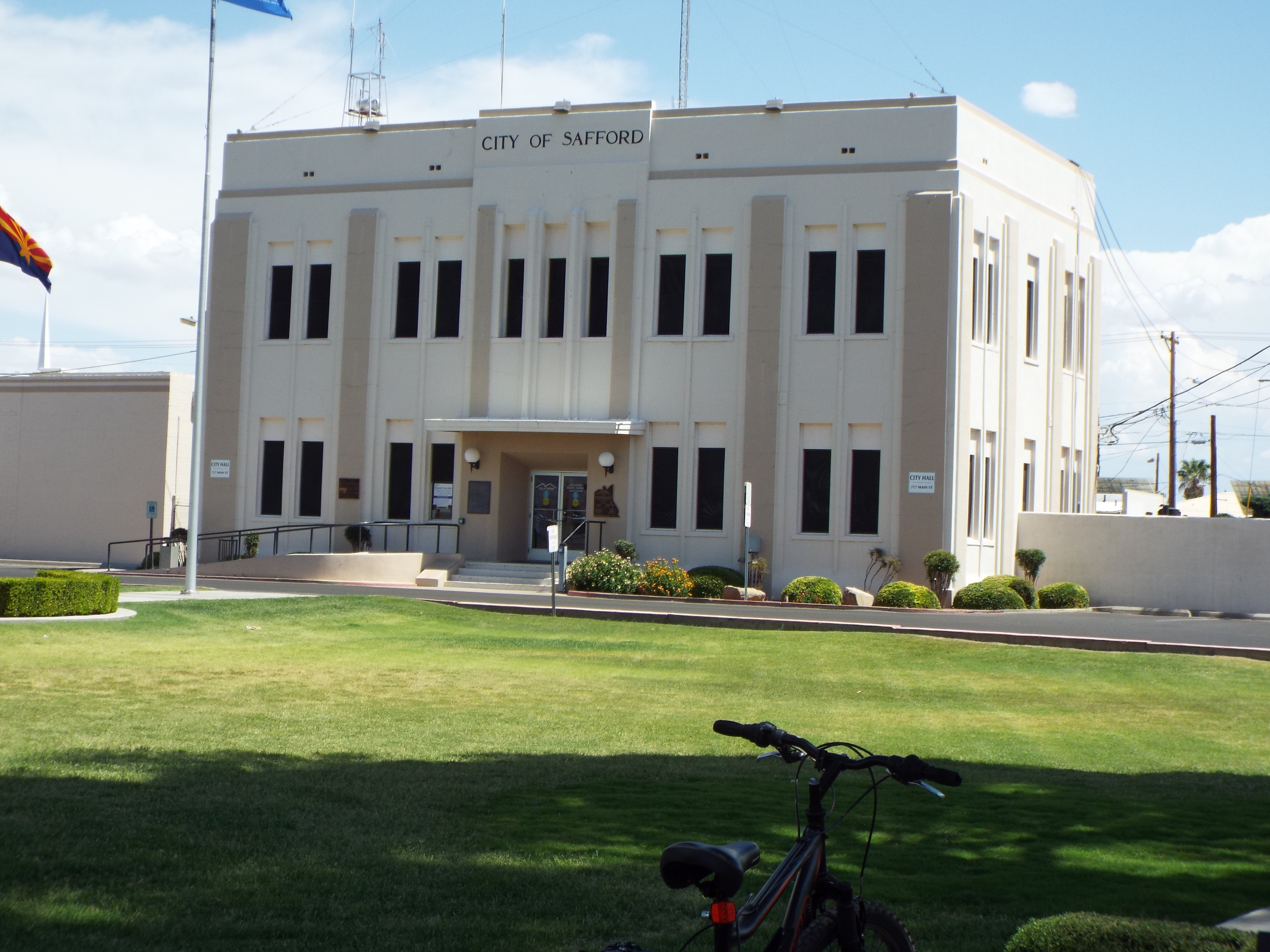
North Ward School – 1898 (now Safford City Hall)

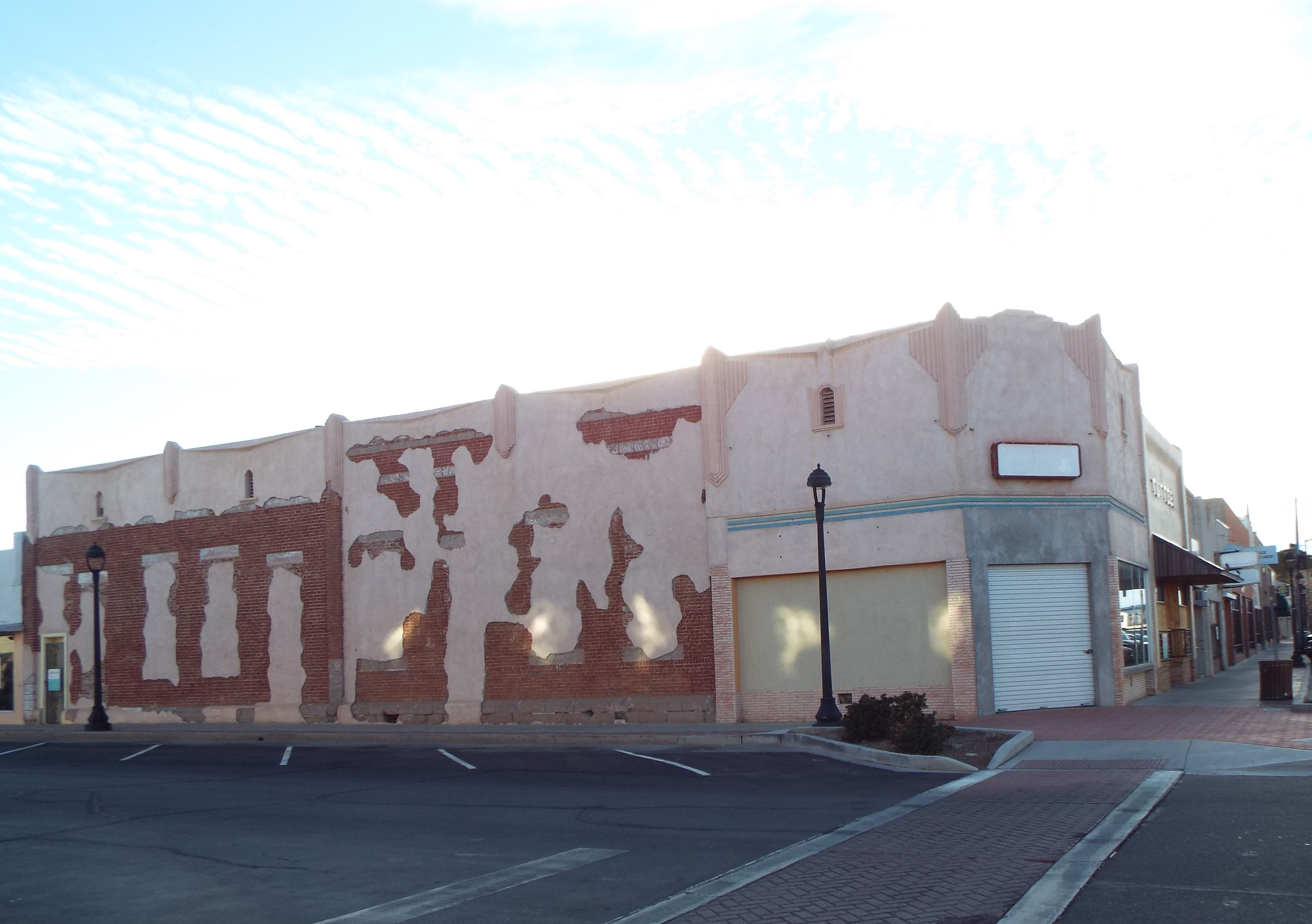
Commercial Store – 1895

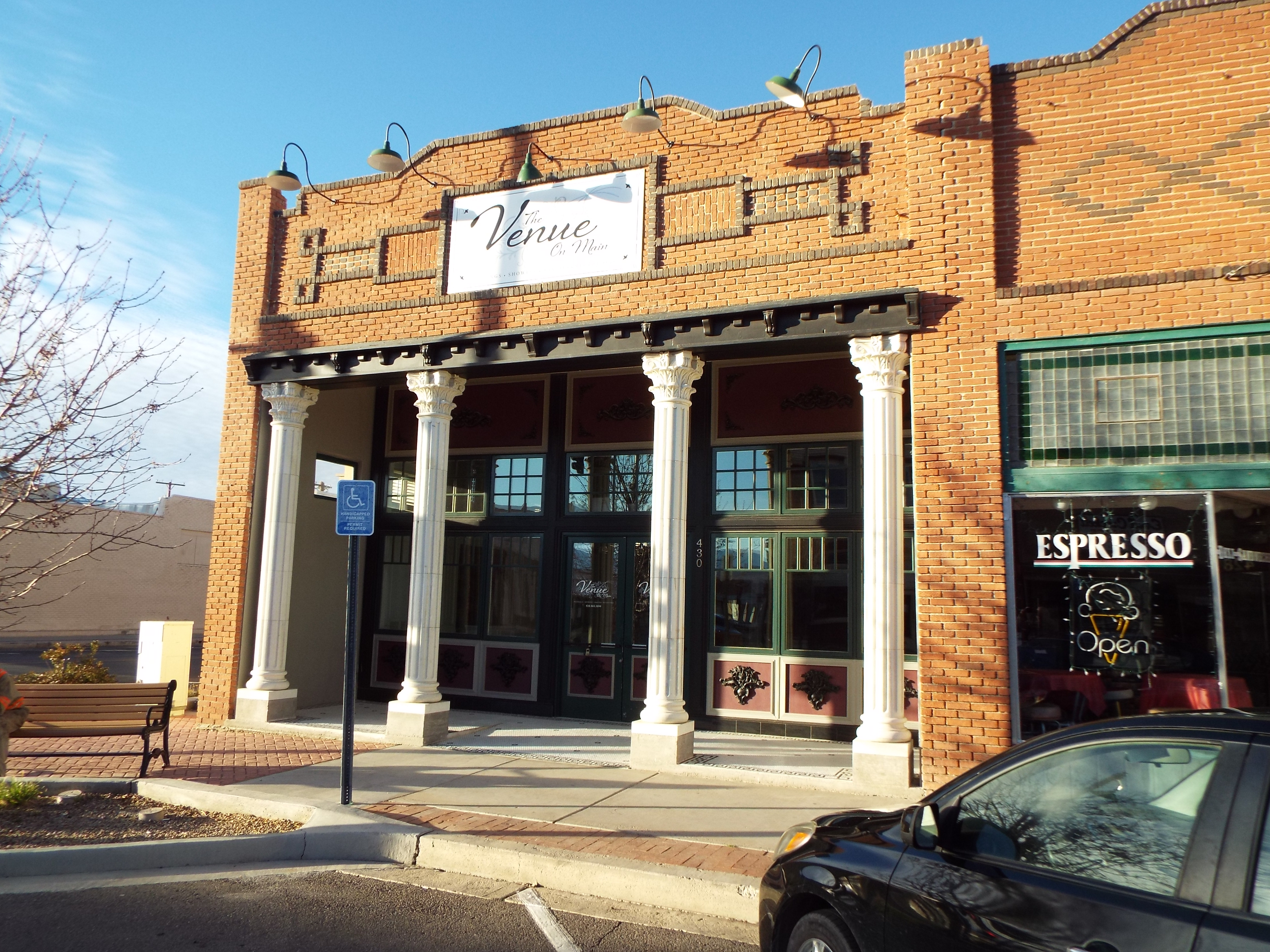
Cobbs Market – 1904

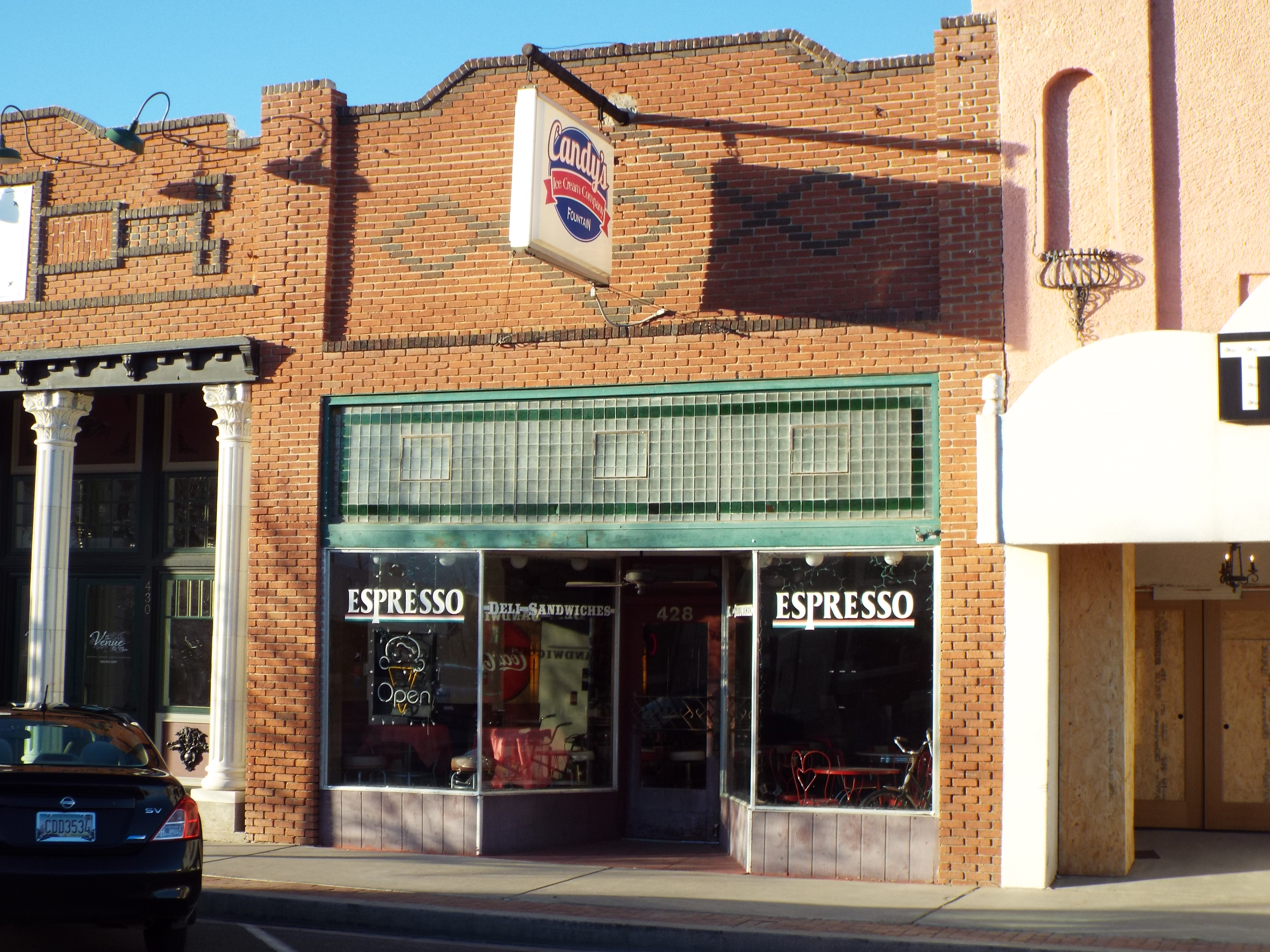
Warner's Drug Store – 1904

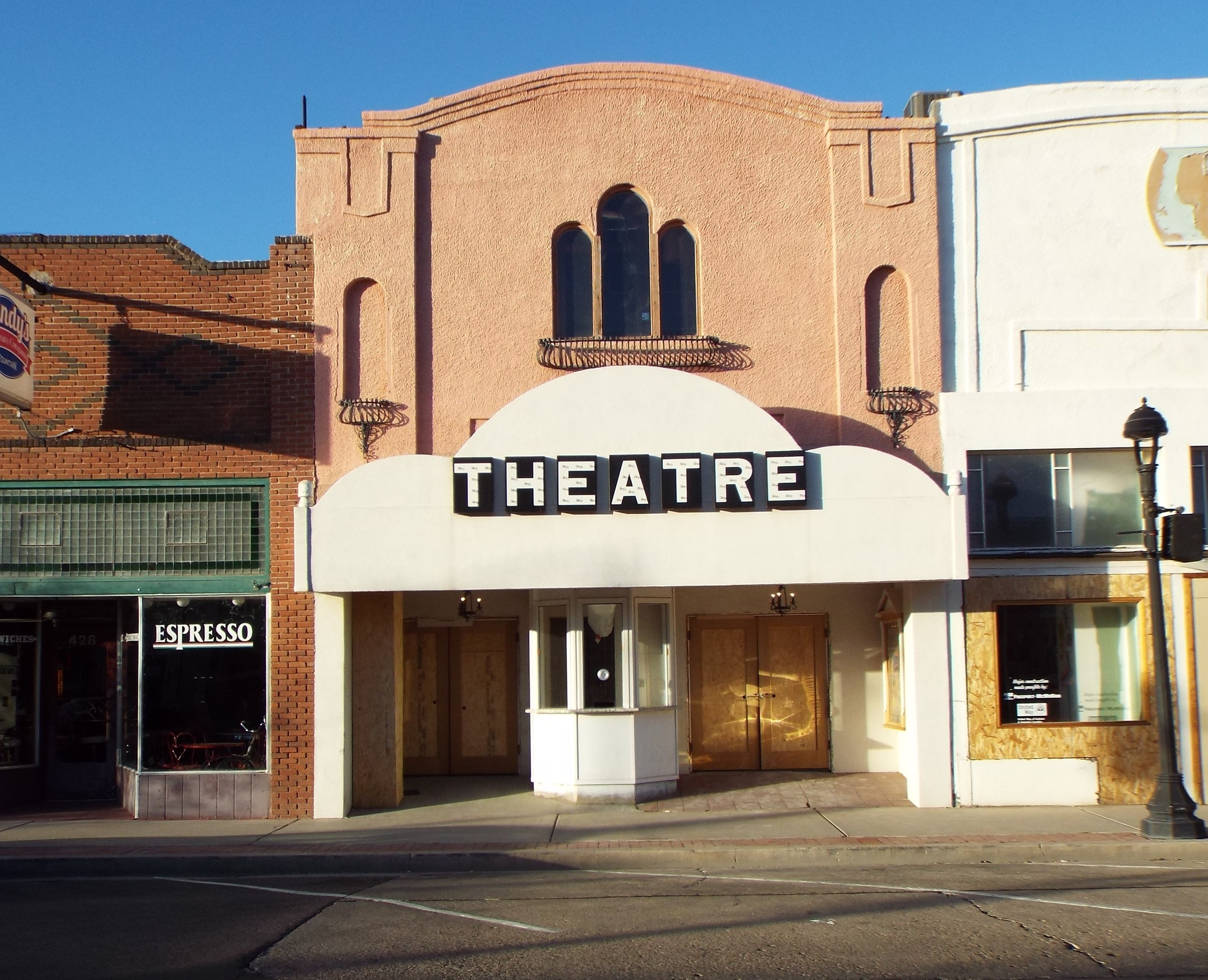
Safford Theater – 1911

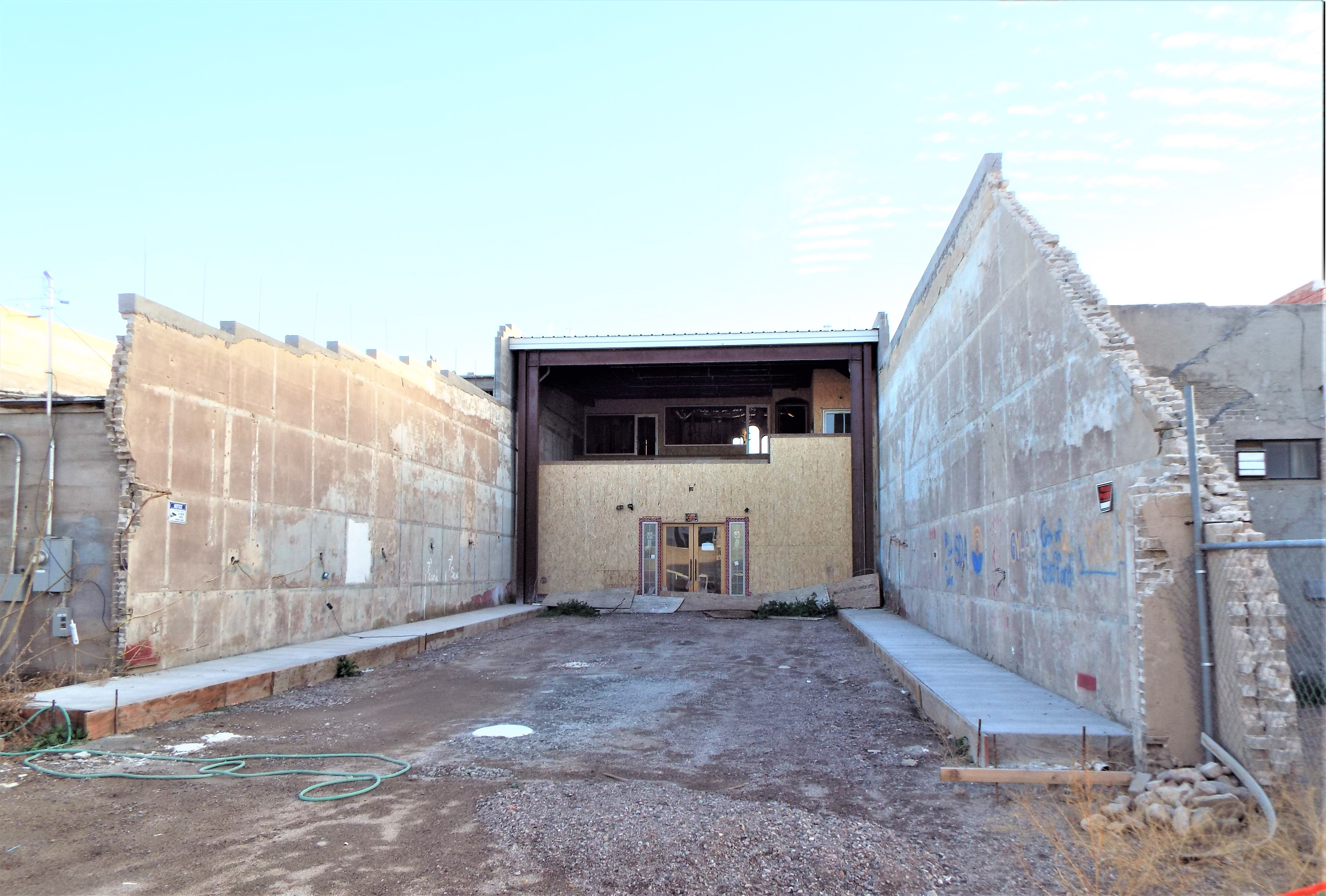
What remains Inside the Safford Theater

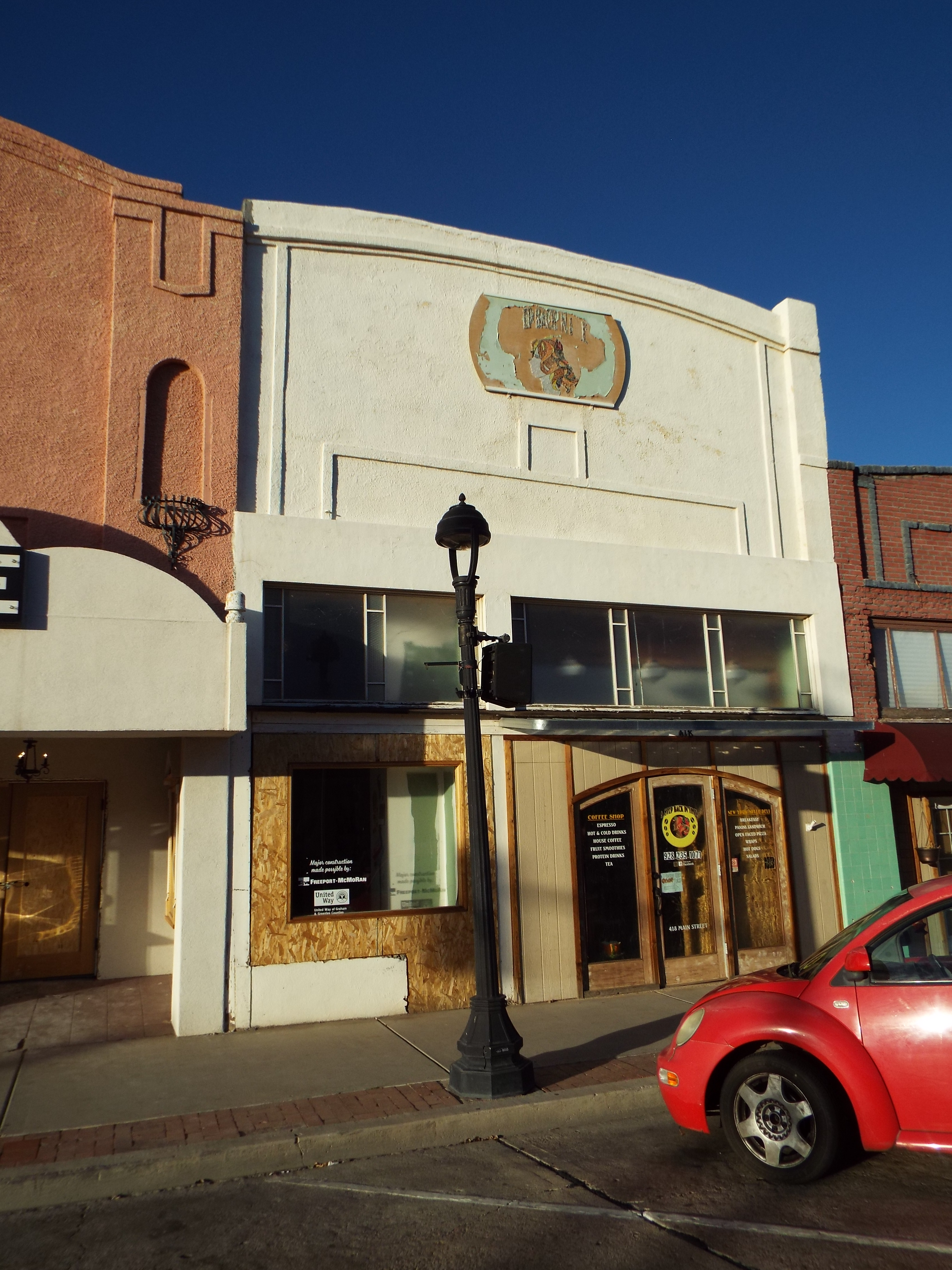
B.F. Thum Dry Goods Store 1920

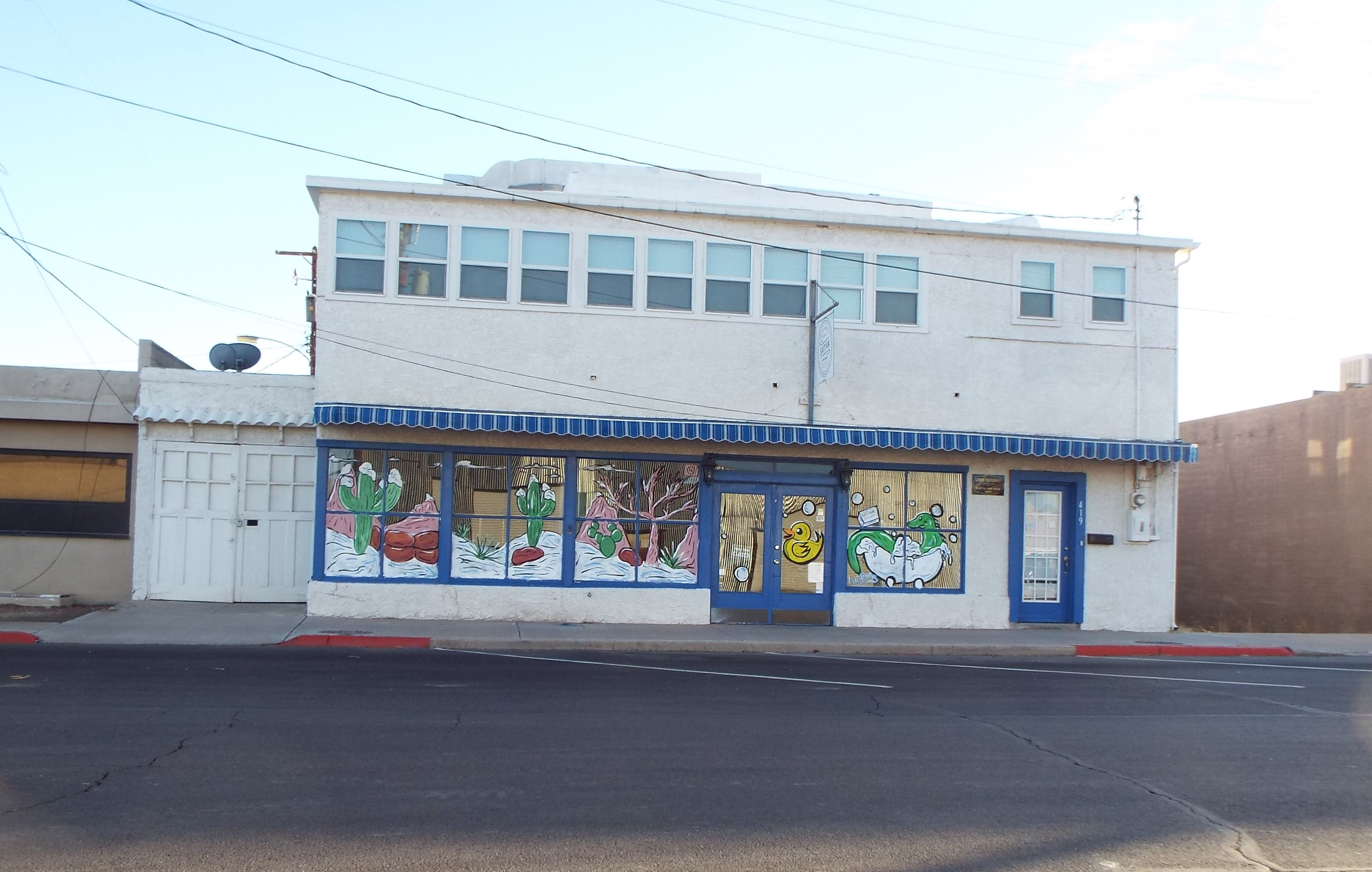
Lewis Building – 1877

== Historic houses ==
The historic houses listed here are included in the Safford Multiple Resource Area Nomination (MRA). The following is a brief description of these historic houses:

- The Joe Horowitz House built in 1928 and located at 118 Main Street. Joe Horowitz was a city council member and store owner. The house was listed in the National Register of Historic Places on February 9, 1988, reference: #87002566.
- The House at 611 Third Avenue – built in 1900 located at 611 3rd Ave. It is the earliest intact adobe residence in Safford and displays a decorative vent and shingled pediment above a boxed cornice. Listed in the National Register of Historic Places on February 9, 1988, reference: #87002568.
- The Mathew O'Brien House – built in 1920 located at 615 1st Ave. Mathew O'Brien was the owner of a furniture store. The O'Brien House is a Western Colonial Revival Style residence constructed of wood frame and stucco with a hipped roof. Listed in the National Register of Historic Places on February 9, 1988, reference: #87002570.
- The Richard Bingham House – built in 1910 located at 1208 9th Ave. Richard Bingham arrived in Safford as a child in 1890. He married at eighteen and built his own home of redwood imported from California. He and his wife, Euphrasia, established the Bingham Transfer Company. The Bingham House is the only extant, intact residence utilizing redwood clapboard building material. Listed in the National Register of Historic Places on February 9, 1988, reference: #87002556.
- The Paul Brooks House – built in 1926 located at 1033 5th Ave. Paul Brooks was the owner of Brooks Lumber. The house was listed in the National Register of Historic Places on February 9, 1988, reference: #87002559.
- The T. D Cross House – built in 1910 located at 908 1st Ave. The Cross House is a T-Plan in the Queen Anne style. The gable-roofed residence displays diamond-patterned shingles at the pediments and is constructed of brick with a belt course and keystone arched lintels. Listed in the National Register of Historic Places on February 9, 1988, reference: #87002563.
- The William Charles Davis House – built in 1915 located at 301 11th Street. William Charles Davis was a carpenter in Safford. He helped build the LDS Academy in Thatcher (three miles west of Safford), Davis also built his own home which was similar to the one he had built in Clifton. The Davis House is a wood frame L-Plan Queen Anne style residence with gabled hip and gable roofs. Listed in the National Register of Historic Places on February 9, 1988, reference: #87002565.
- The George A. Olney House – built in 1890 located at 1104 Central Ave. George Olney was a stockman and banker. He was elected Graham County Sheriff for two terms, served in the Twentieth Territorial Legislature in 1898, was a member of the Graham County Board of Supervisors, served on the school board and ran for Governor in 1917. The Olney House is a mansion constructed in the Western Colonial Revival Style. Listed in the National Register of Historic Places on February 9, 1988, reference: #87002574.
- The Alonzo Hamilton Packer House – built in 1892 located at 1203 Central Ave. Alonso Packer was a skilled brick mason and built his own home. Packer owned and operated a general merchandise store. The Packer house is the earliest extant Queen Anne style residence in the Safford Multiple Resource Area. The rectangular brick residence displays a gabled hip wood shingle roof with two interior corbeled chimneys and cast stone quoins. Listed in the National Register of Historic Places on February 9, 1988, reference: #87002575.
- The Dan Williams House – built in 1895 located at 603 Relation Street. The William house is a Queen Anne style brick residence, with L-Plan gable roof. Listed in the National Register of Historic Places on February 9, 1988, reference: #87002584.
- The David Ridgeway House – built in 1905 located at 928 Central Ave. David Ridgeway was the owner of the Young and Ridgeway Mercantile. The Ridgeway house was originally an L-Plan, which was converted to a T-Plan as the Ridgeway family grew. The home was built of cut stone with no distinctive detailing. Listed in the National Register of Historic Places on February 9, 1988, reference: #87002576.
- The Hugh Talley House – built in 1929 located at 1114 3rd Ave. Hugh Talley was in the building and contracting business for many years and built his own home. He served as Graham County Sheriff until his death in 1936. The Hugh Talley home was built of frame and stucco and constructed in a U-Plan with gable roof. Listed in the National Register of Historic Places on February 9, 1988, reference: #87002580.
- The William Talley House – built in 1928 located at 219 11th Street. William Talley became Safford's first licensed contractor and built his own home. This house represents the best example of a Spanish Colonial Revival style residence in Safford. Listed in the National Register of Historic Places on February 9, 1988, reference: #87002581.
- The James R. Welker House – built in 1913 located at 1127 Central Ave. Welker farmed and helped enlarge the Montezuma Canal and build the Sunflower Canal. He later served as water master. In 1888, he freighted supplies from Bowie to Globe, Arizona and began a general merchandise store, the J.R. Welker and Company, on the Bowie Road. The Welker house is the only remaining brick Queen Anne Transitional residence in the Safford MRA. Listed in the National Register of Historic Places on February 9, 1988, reference: #87002582.
- The David Wickersham House – built in 1930 located at 1101 5th Ave. David Wickersham was part owner of the Soloman Wickersham Wholesale Grocery. The house was listed in the National Register of Historic Places on February 9, 1988, reference: #87002583.
- The J. Mark Wilson House – built in 1929 located at 712 Relation Street. Mark Wilson was an influential community leader and cattleman. In the 1920s he began the Clifford and Wilson Company which engaged in cattle feeding. This business later became the Safford Packing Company. The house was listed in the National Register of Historic Places on February 9, 1988, reference: #87002585.

== Historic houses pictured ==
The following are the images of the historic houses in Safford.

Historic Houses
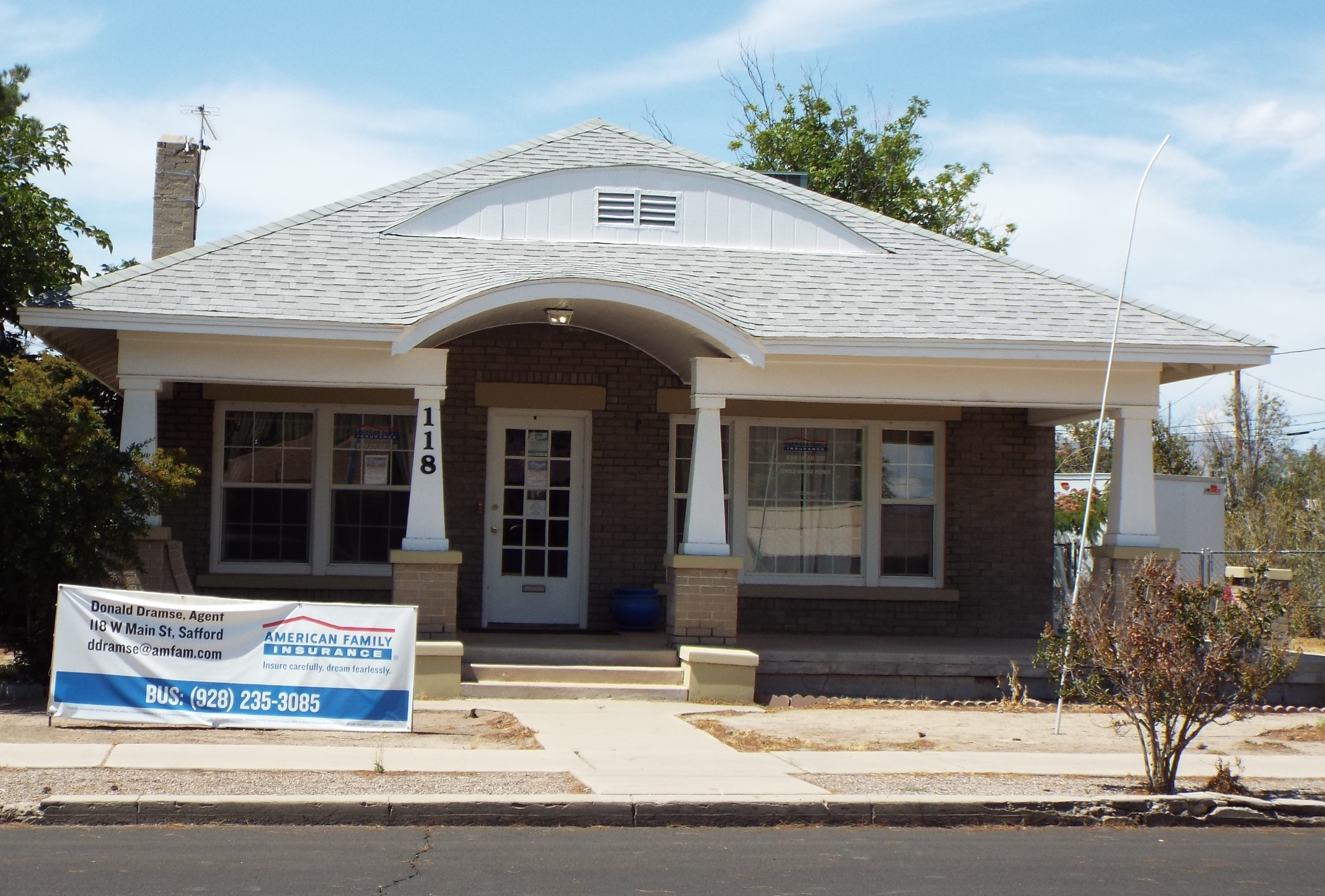
The Joe Horowitz House – 1928

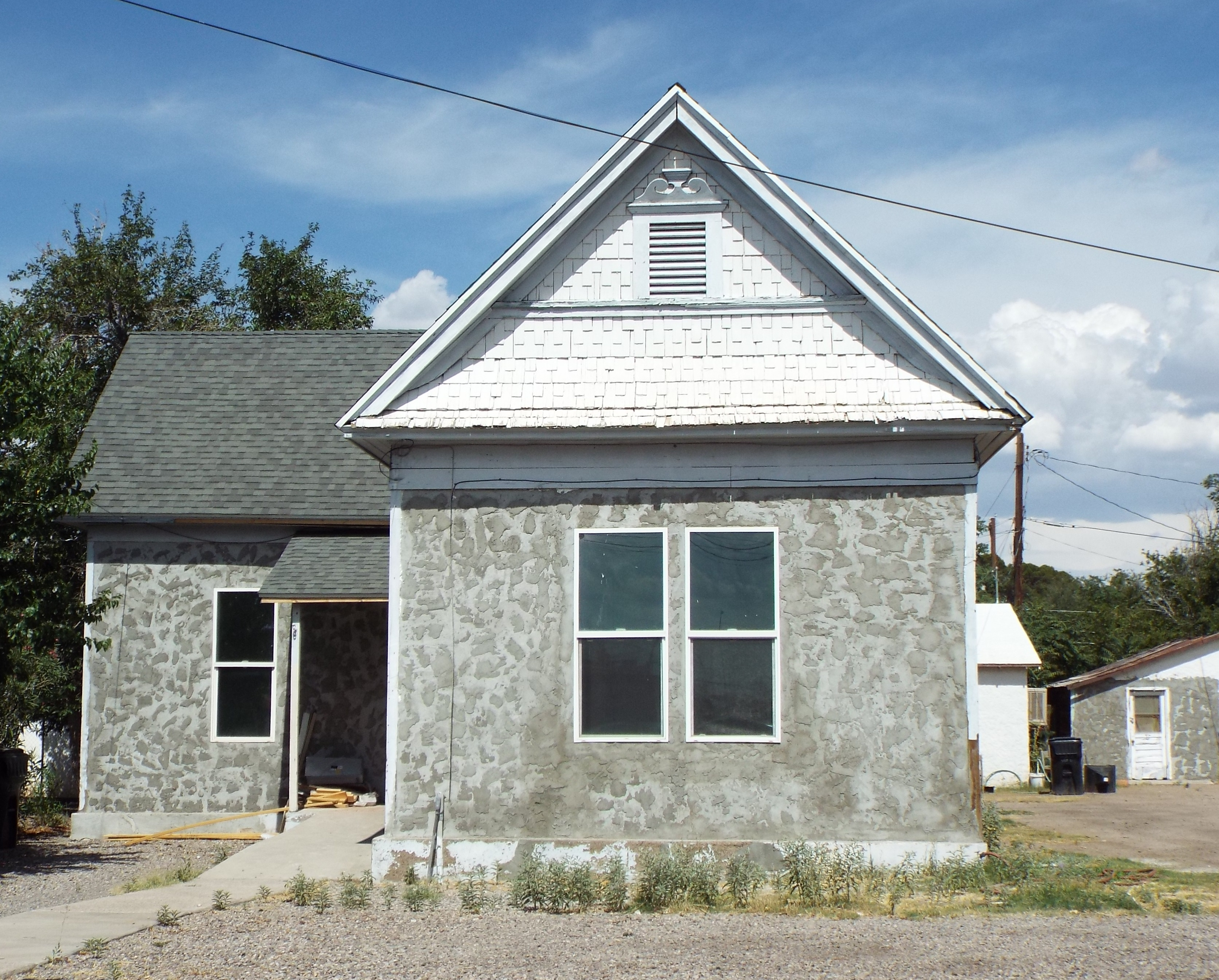
The House at 611 Third Avenue – 1900

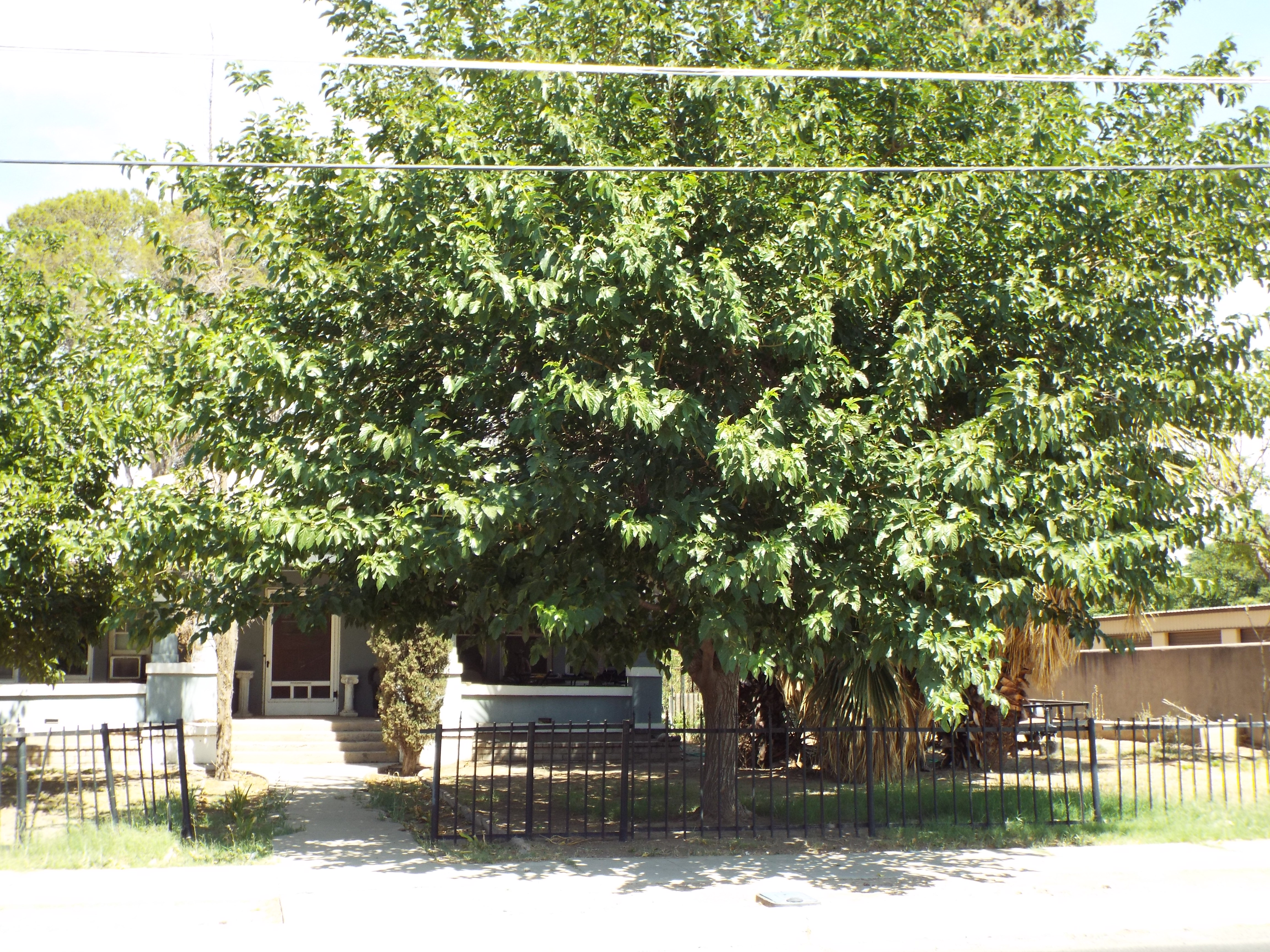
The Mathew O'Brien House – 1920

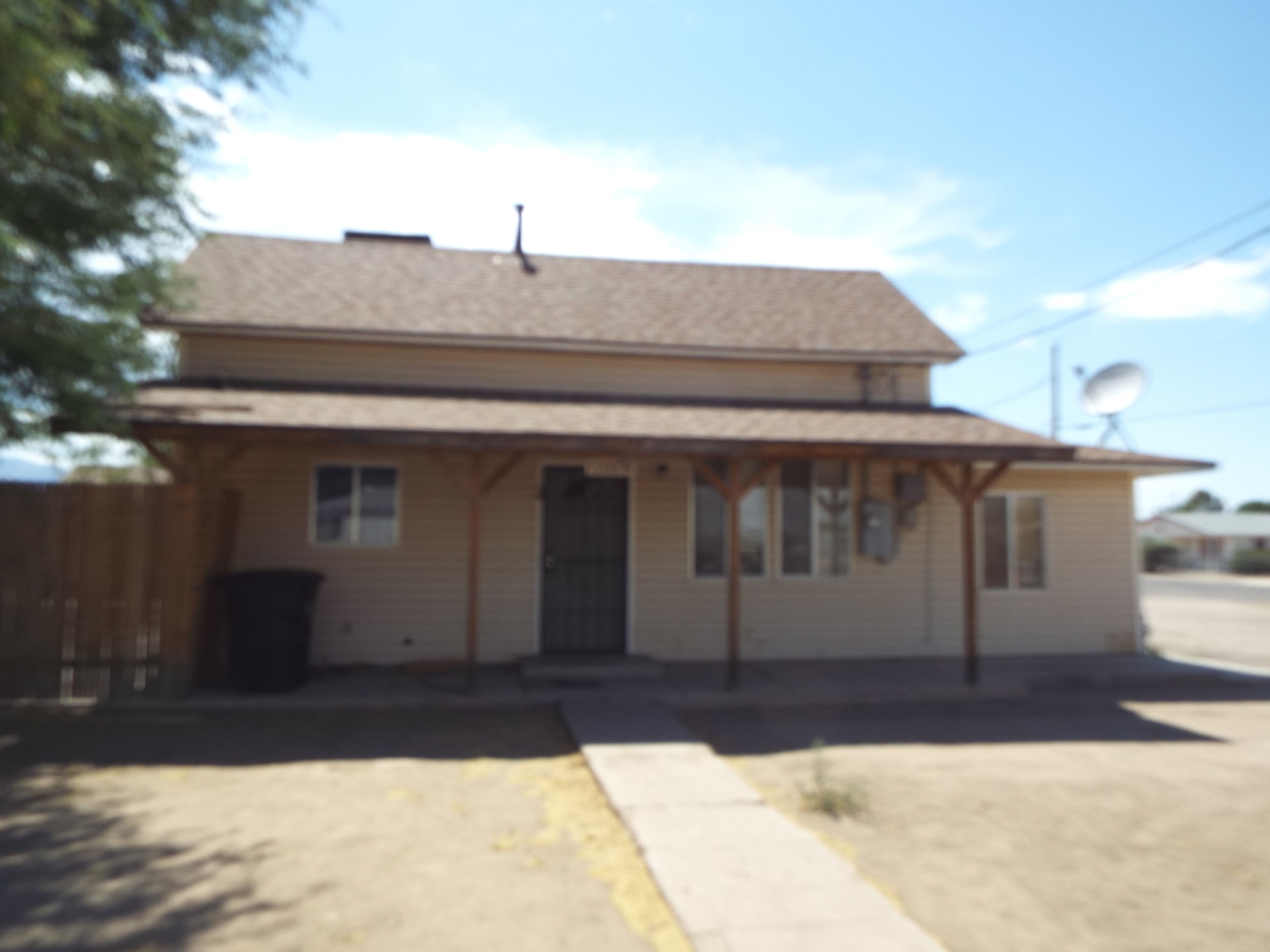
The Richard Bingham House – 1910

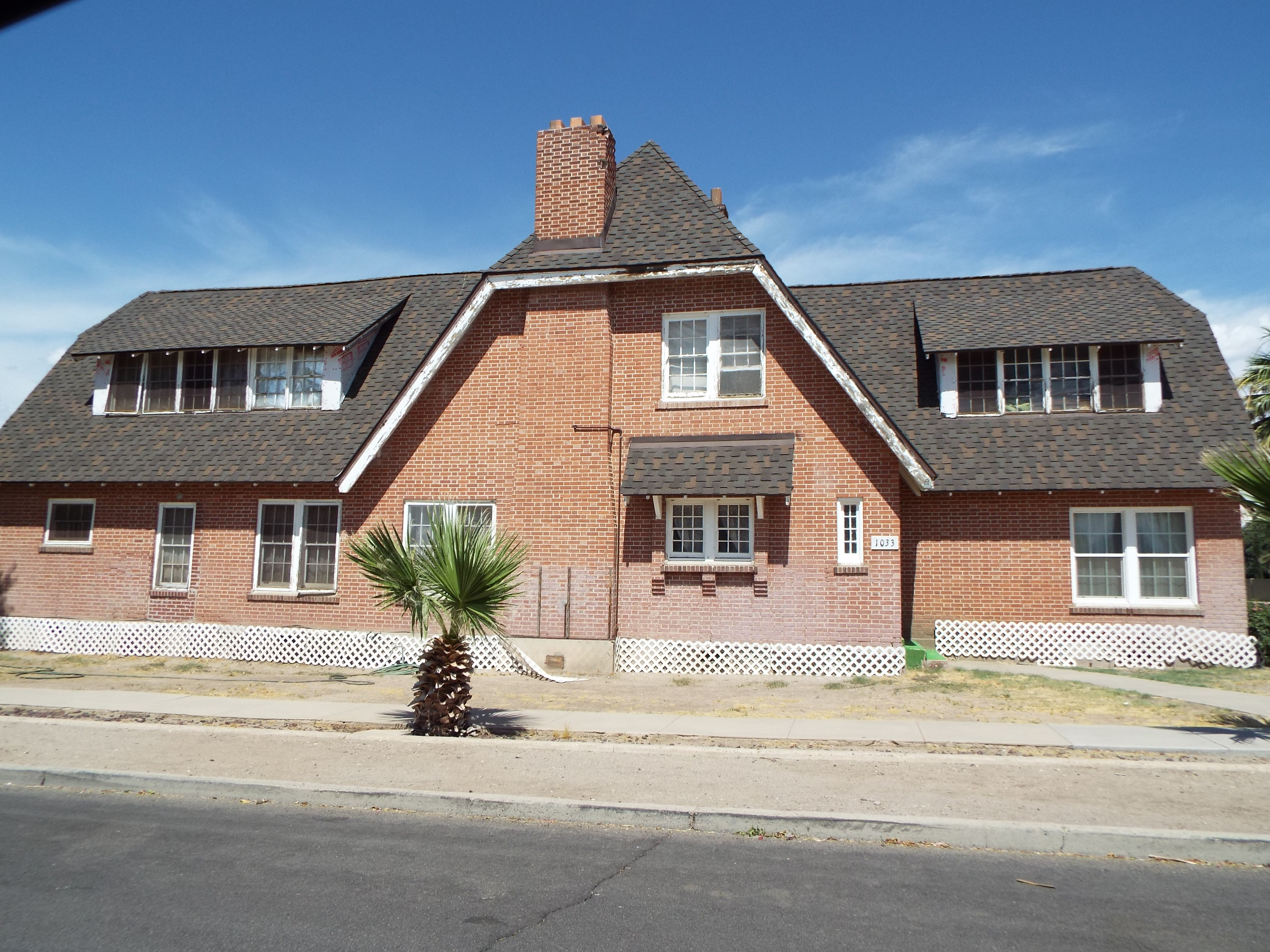
The Paul Brooks House – 1926

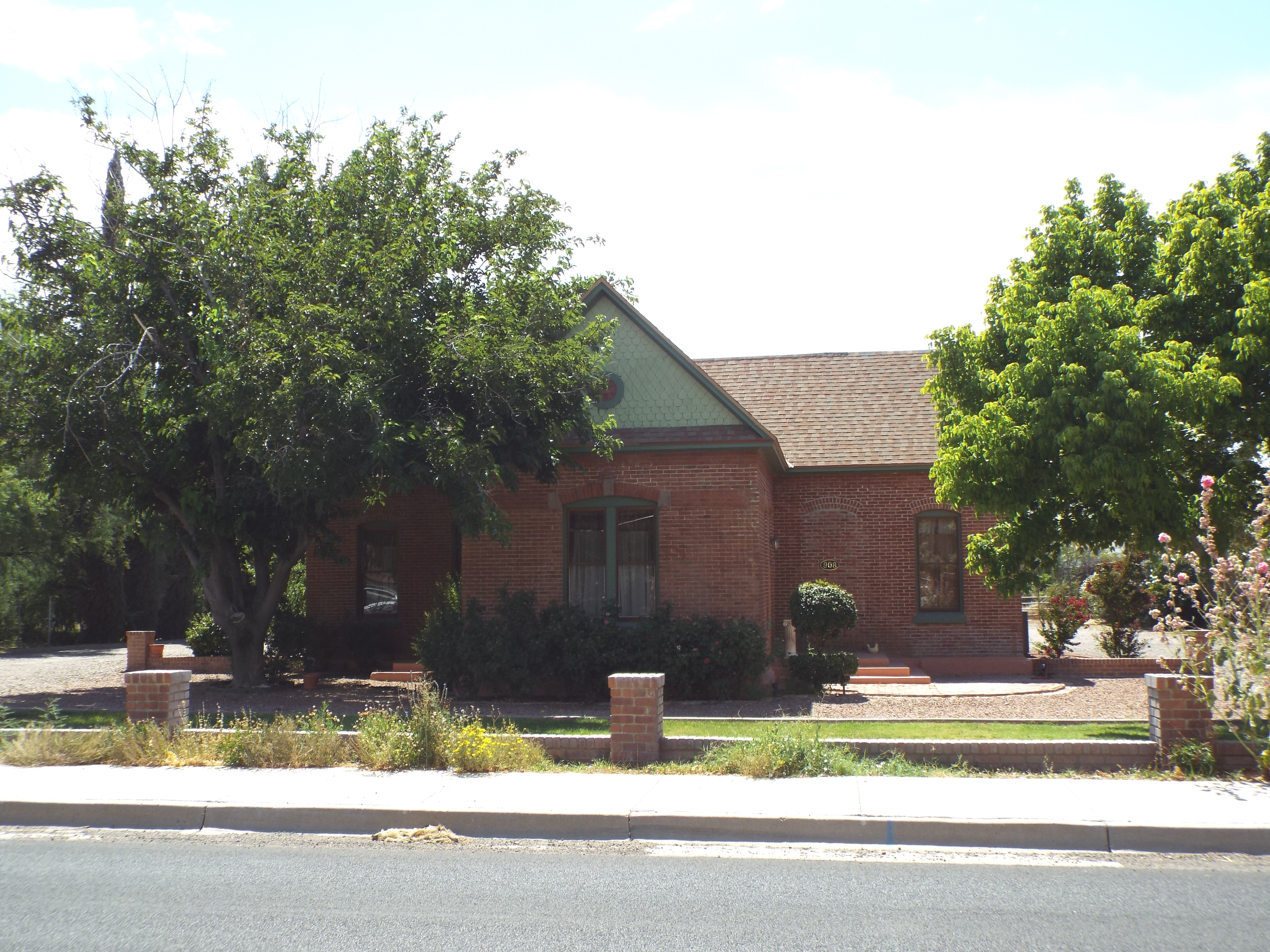
The T. D Cross House – 1910

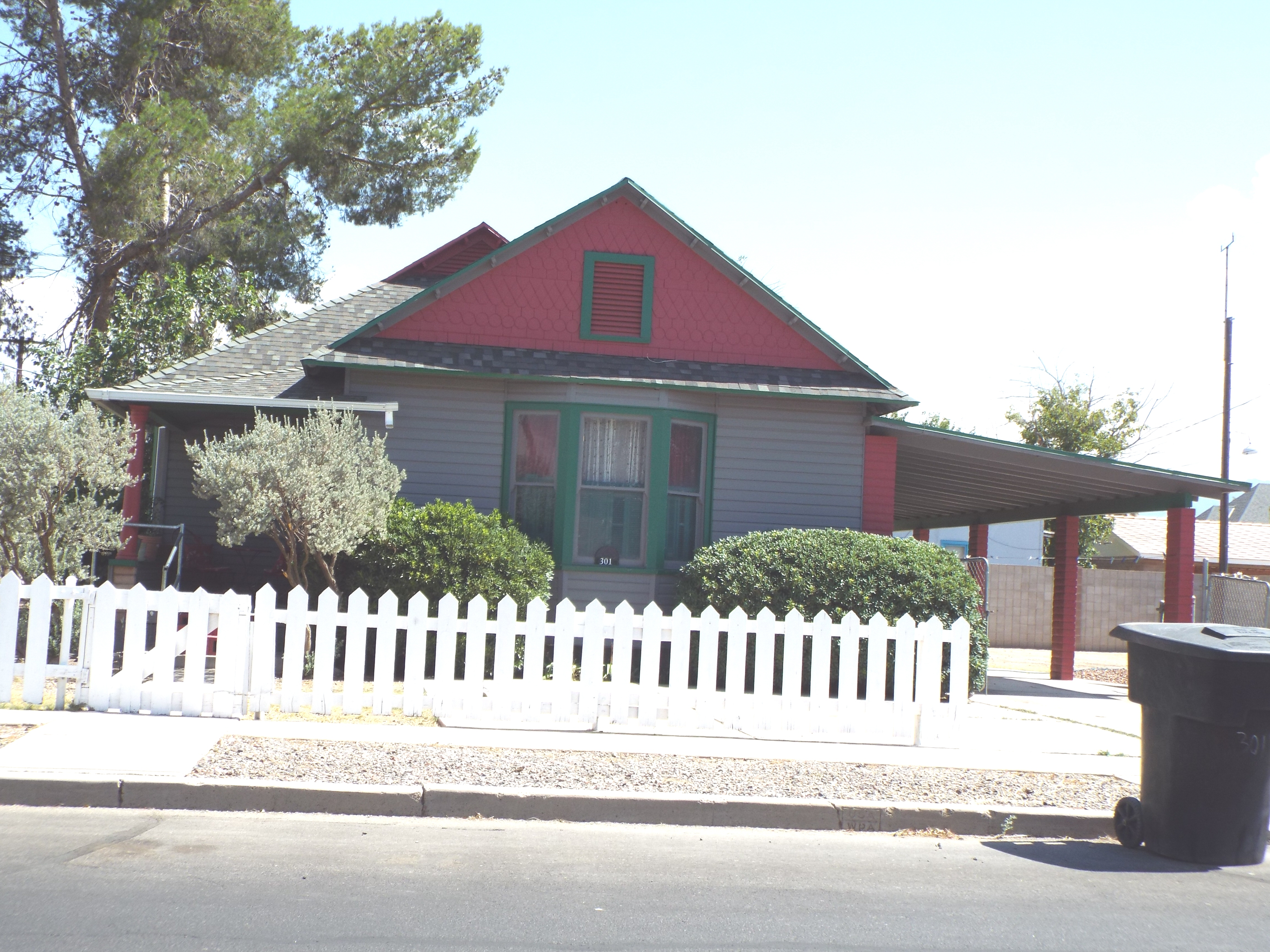
The William Charles Davis House – 1915

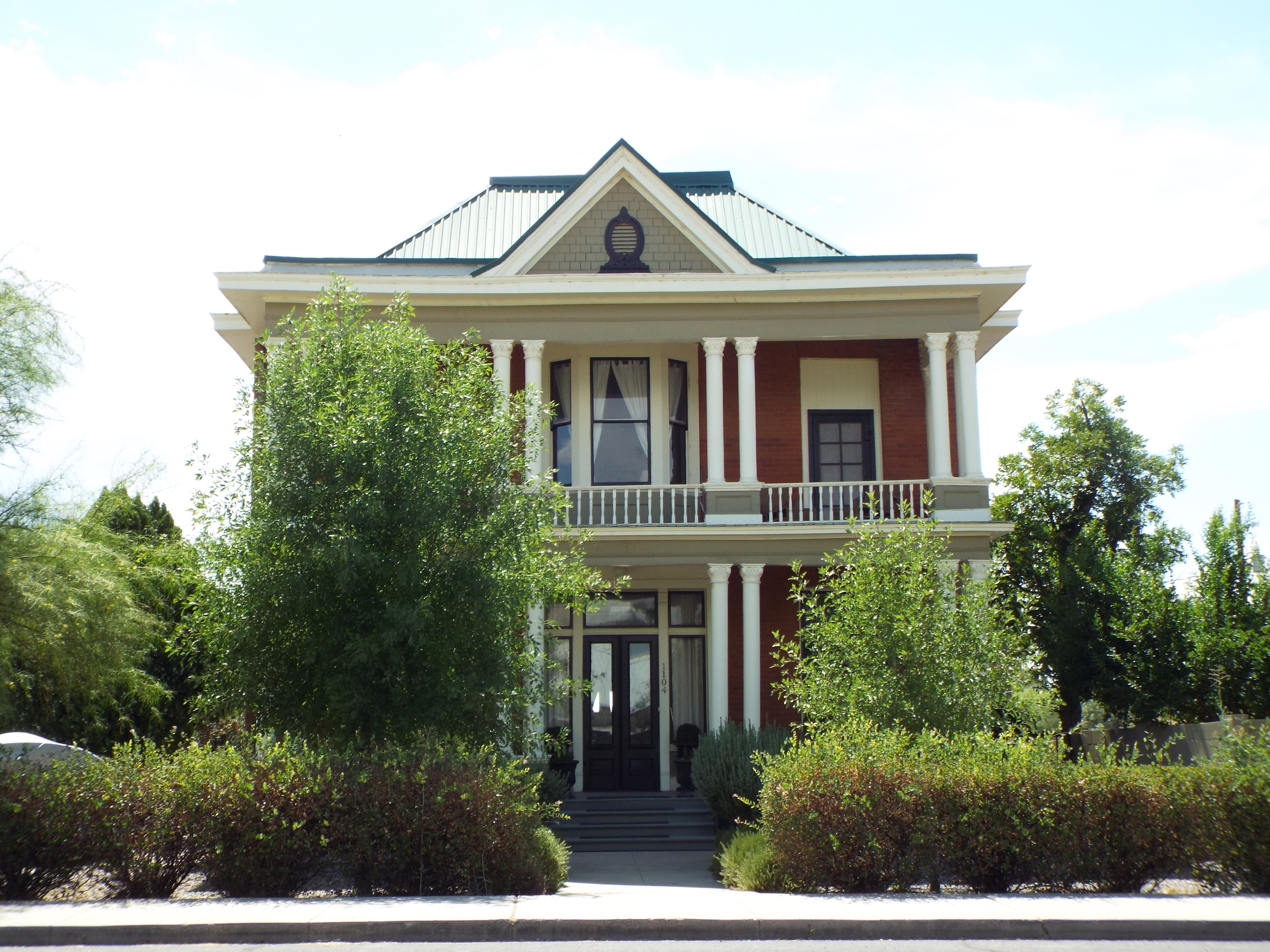
The George A. Olney House – 1890

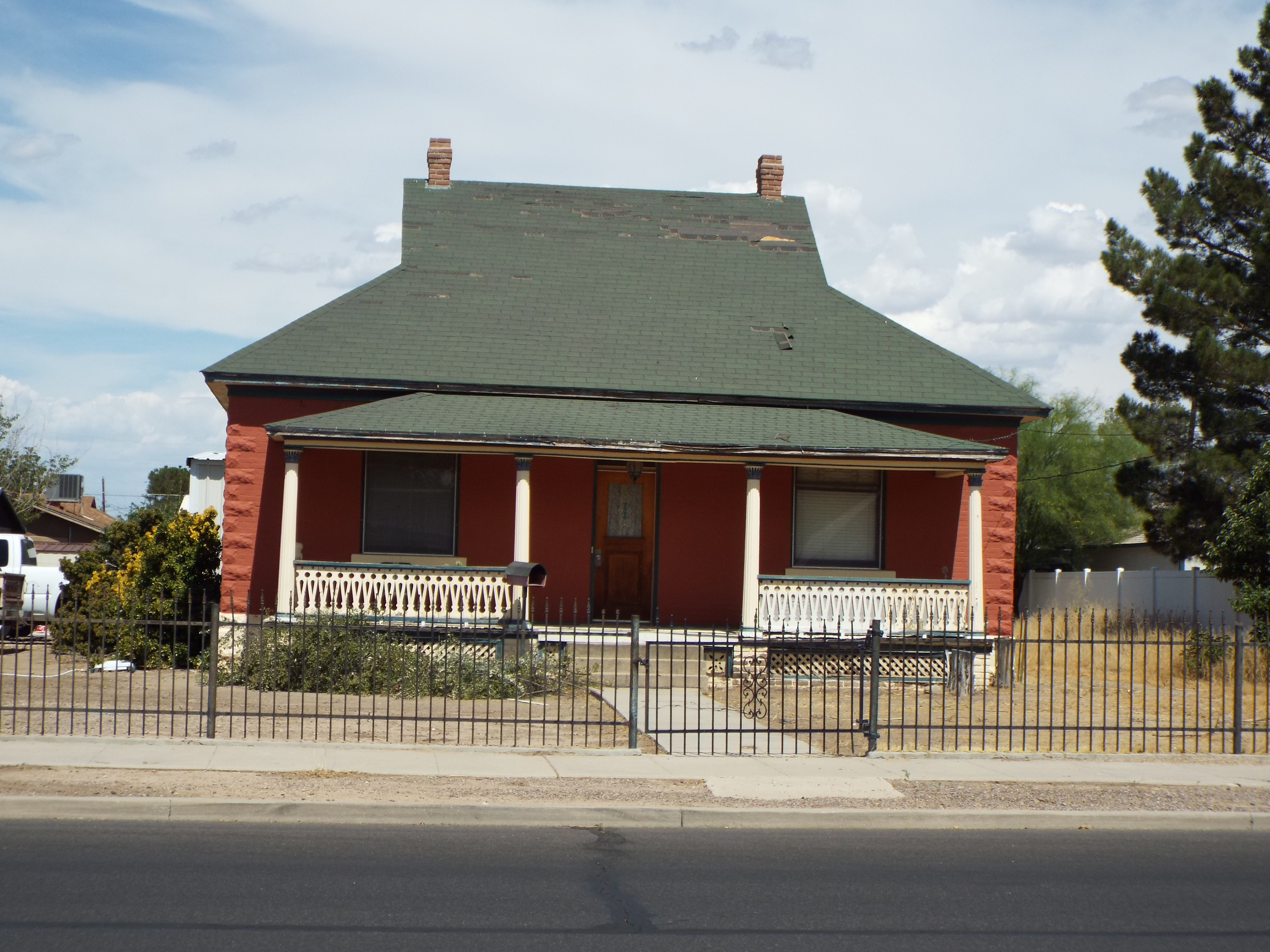
The Alonzo Hamilton Packer House – 1892

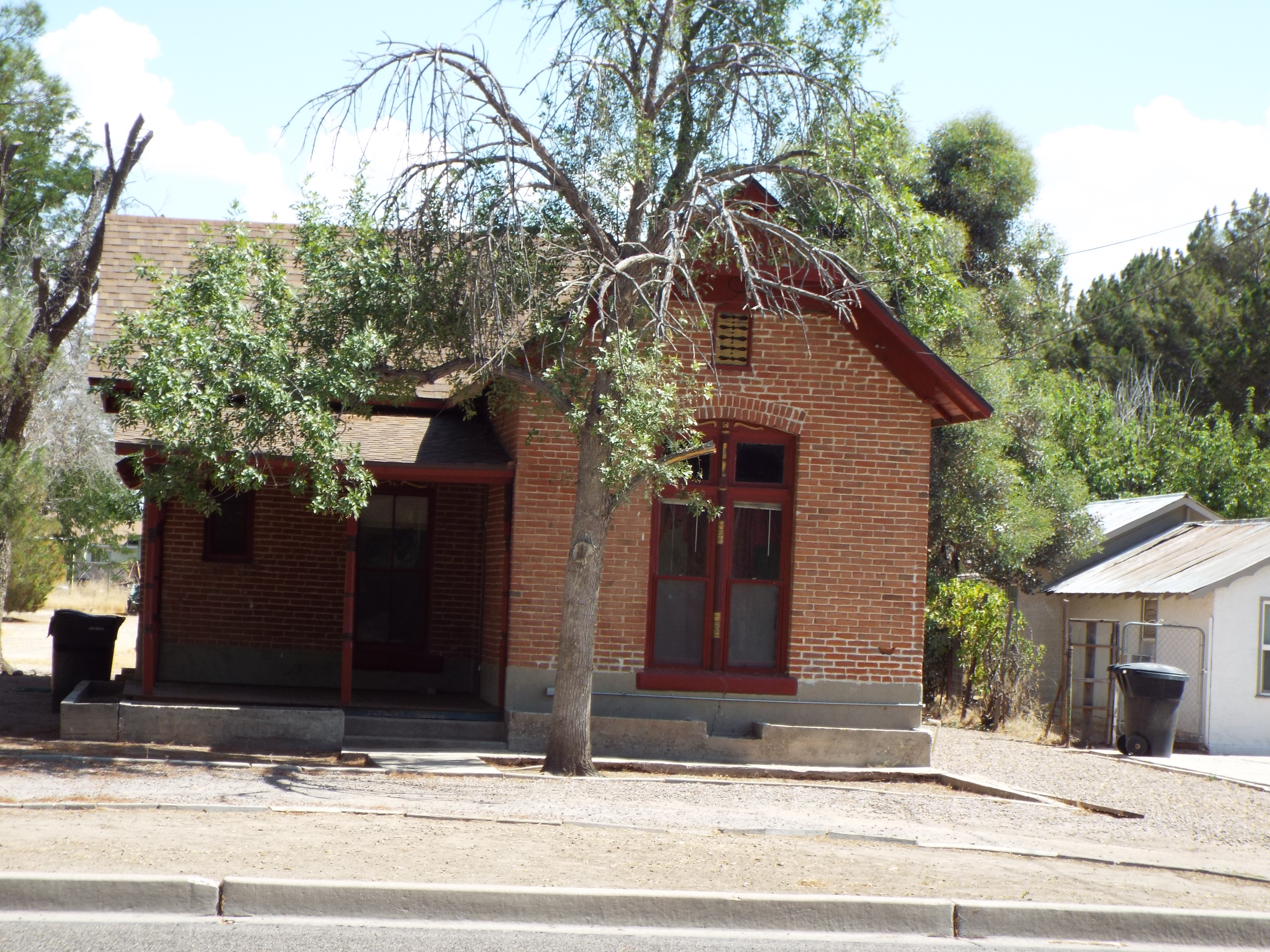
The Dan Williams House – 1895

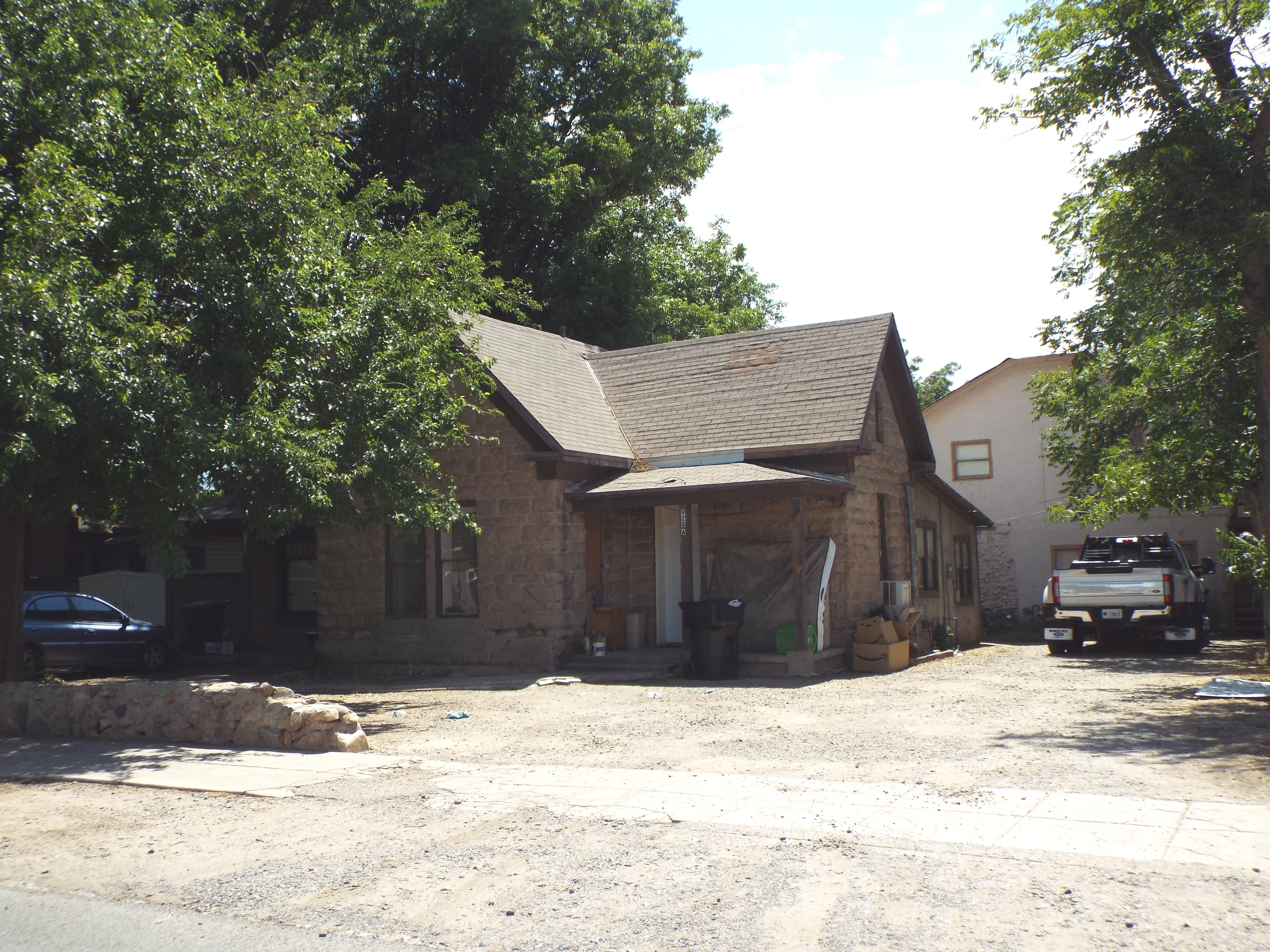
The David Ridgeway House – 1905

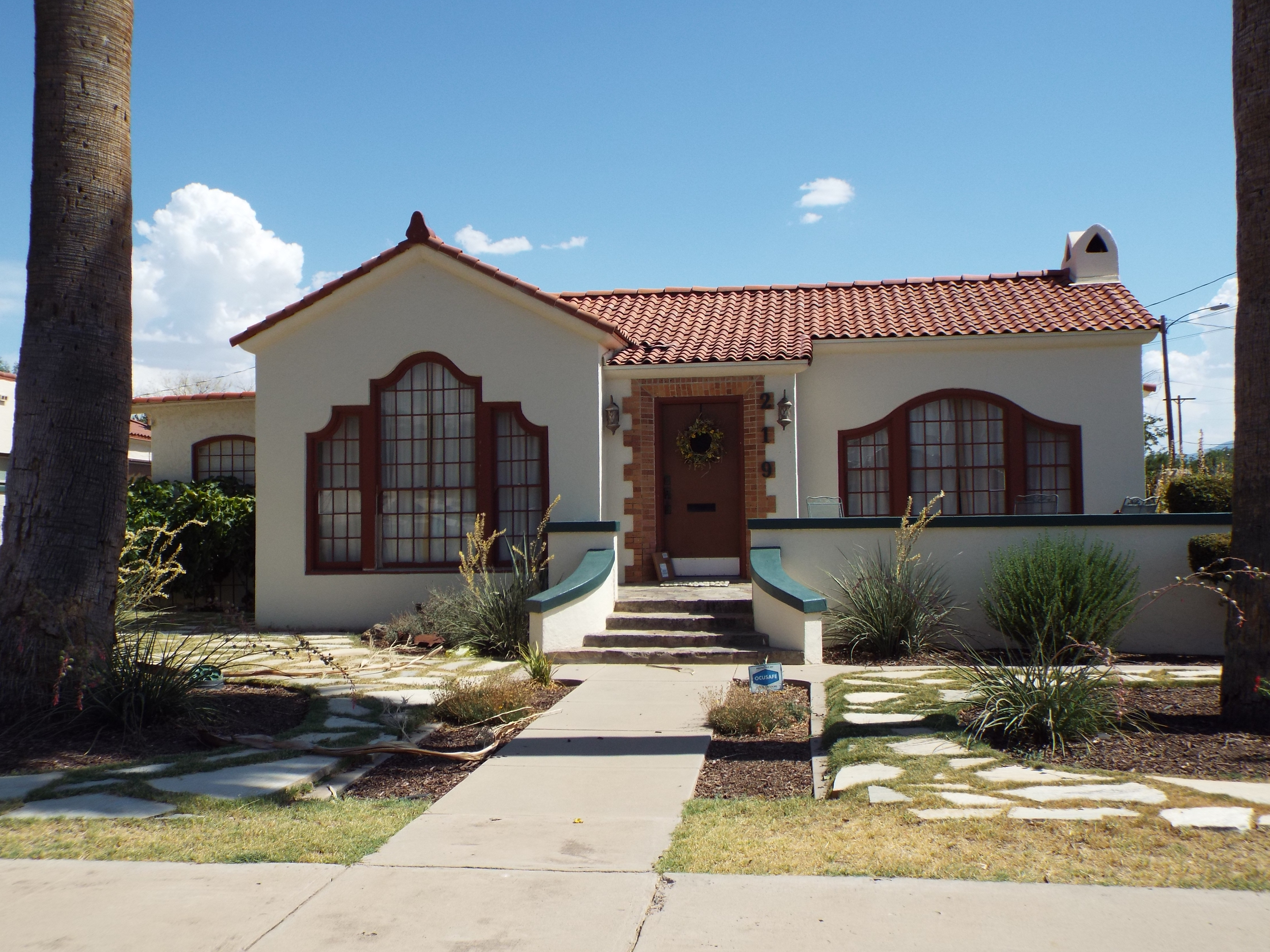
The William Talley House – 1928

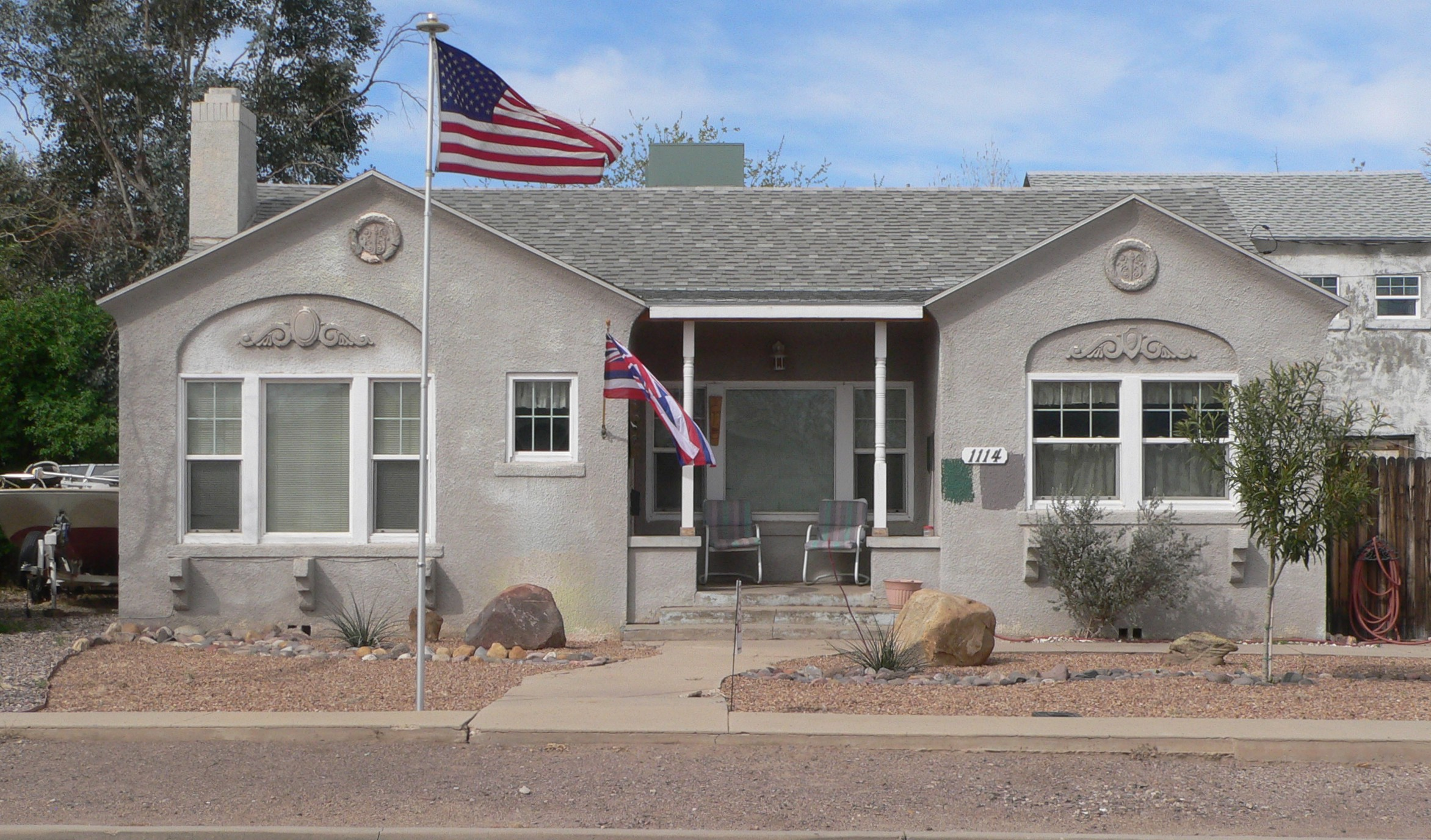
The Hugh Talley House – 1929

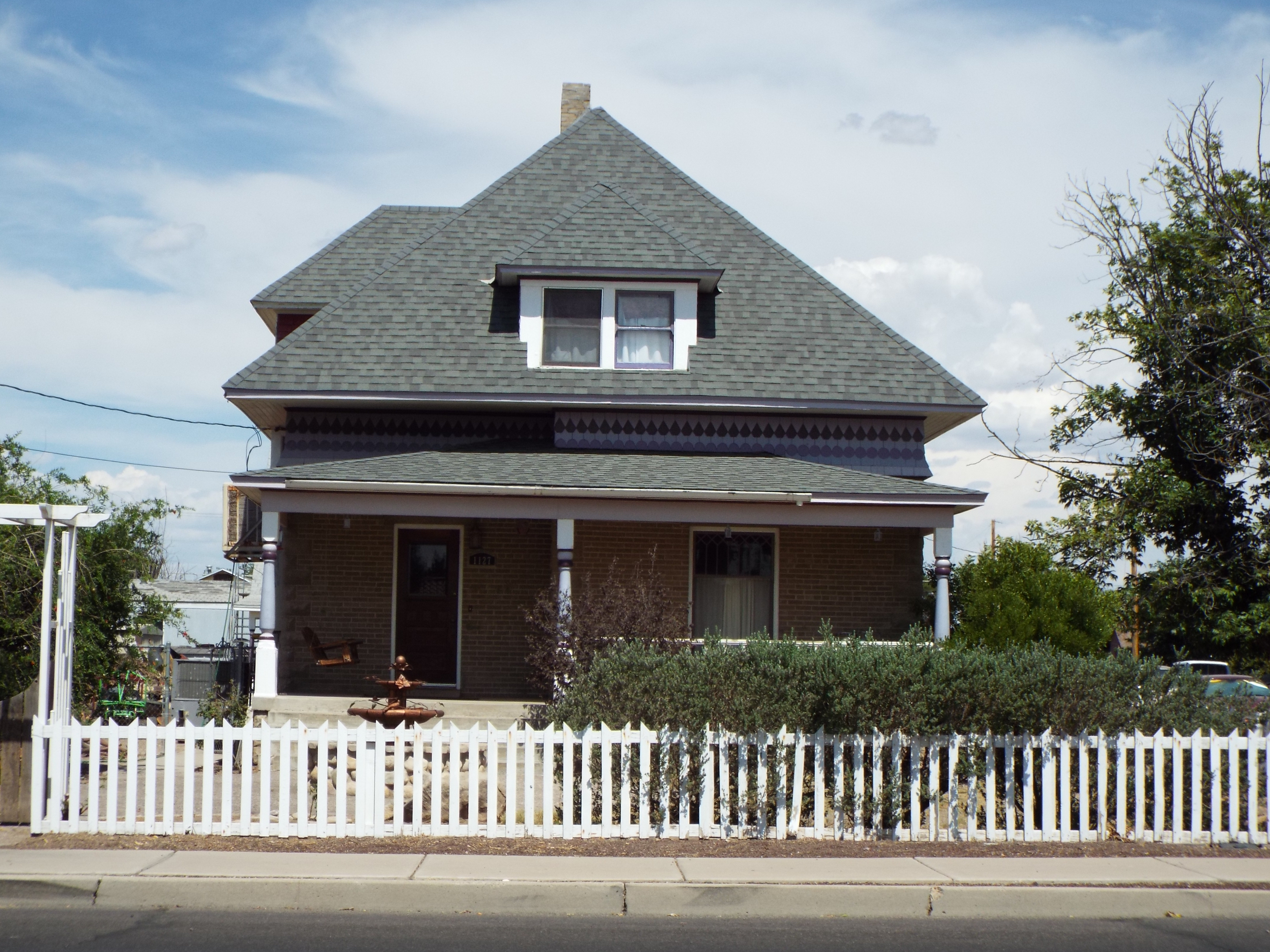
The James R. Welker House – 1913

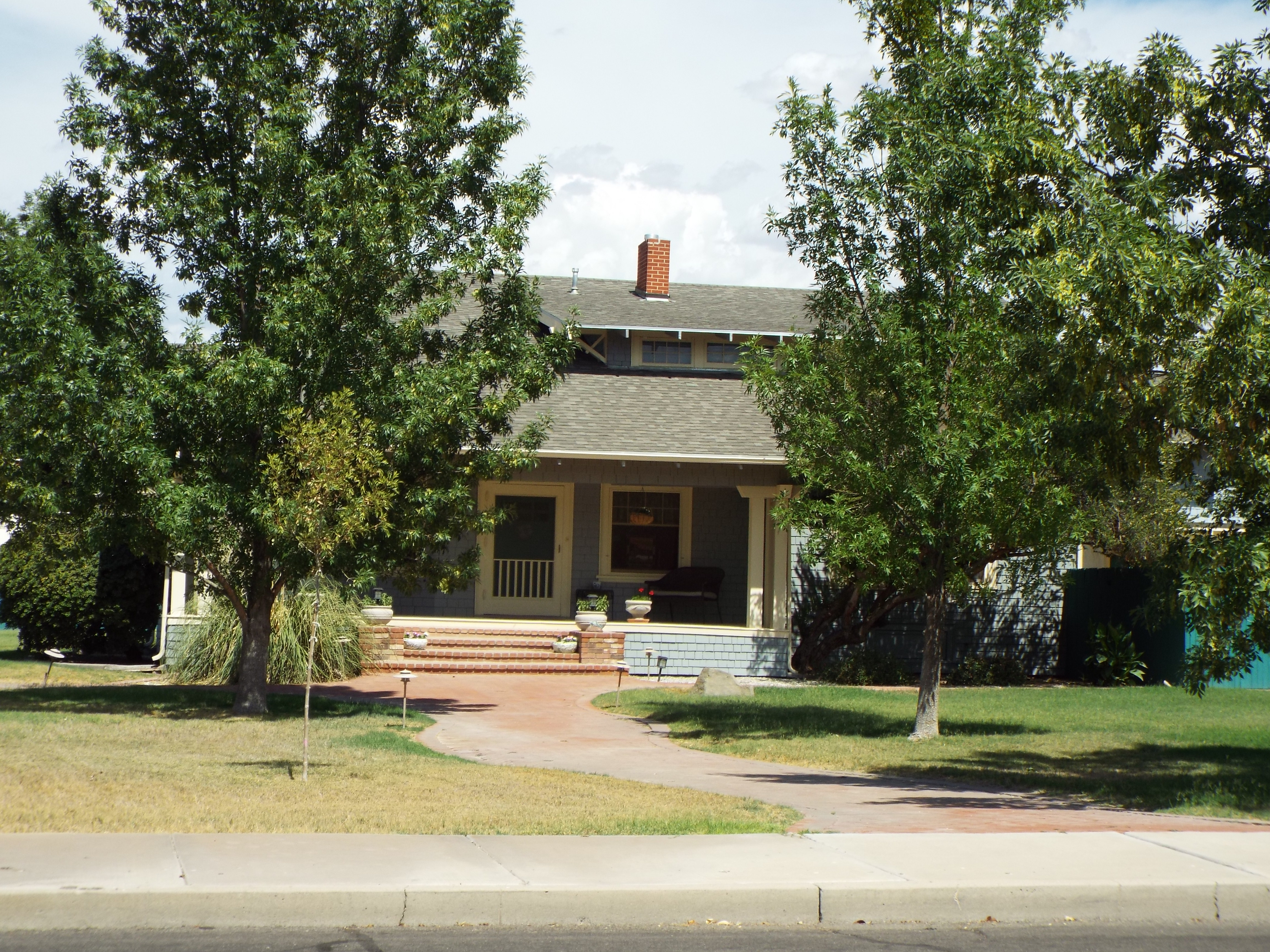
The David Wickersham House – 1930

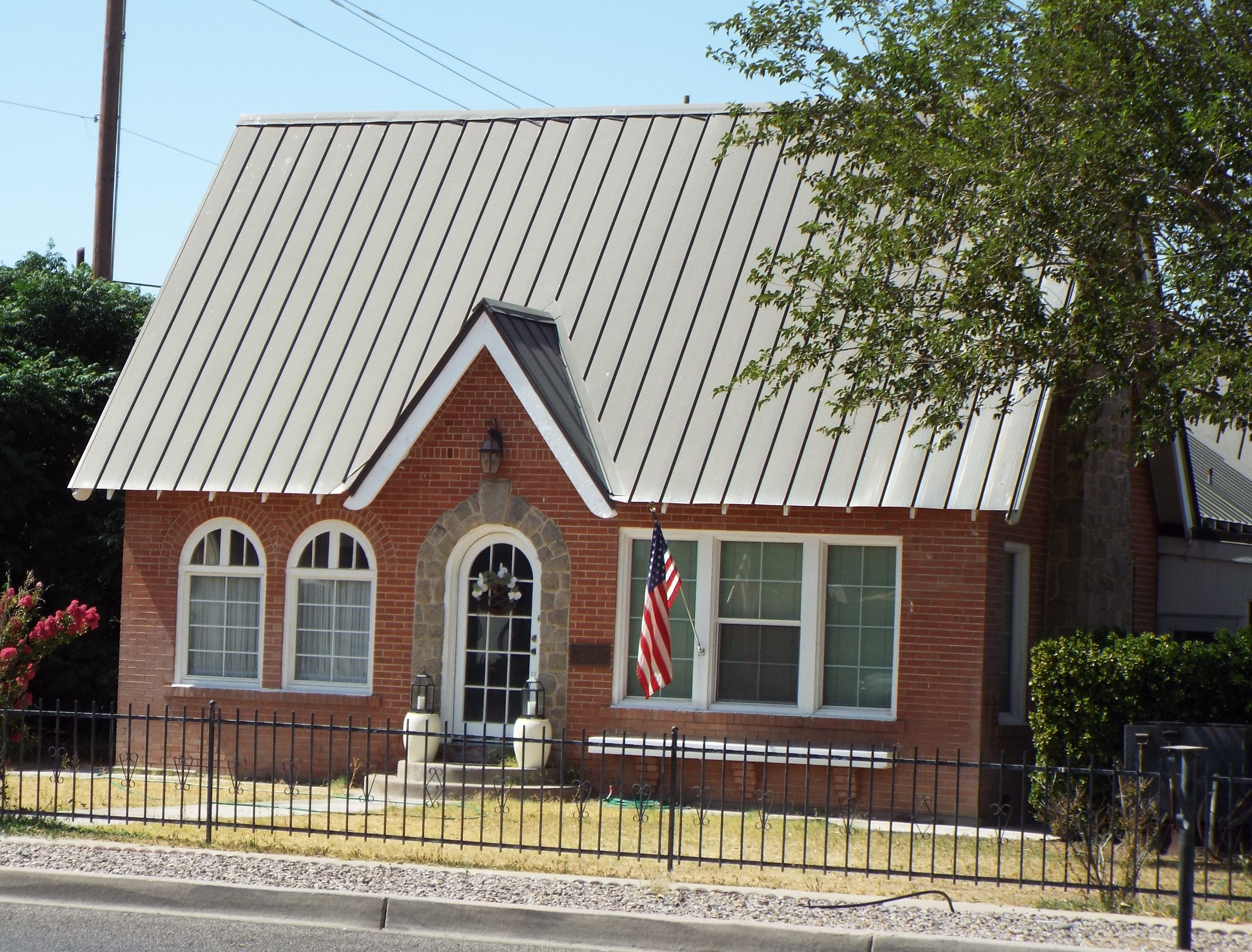
The J. Mark Wilson House – 1929

== Historic districts, etc. ==
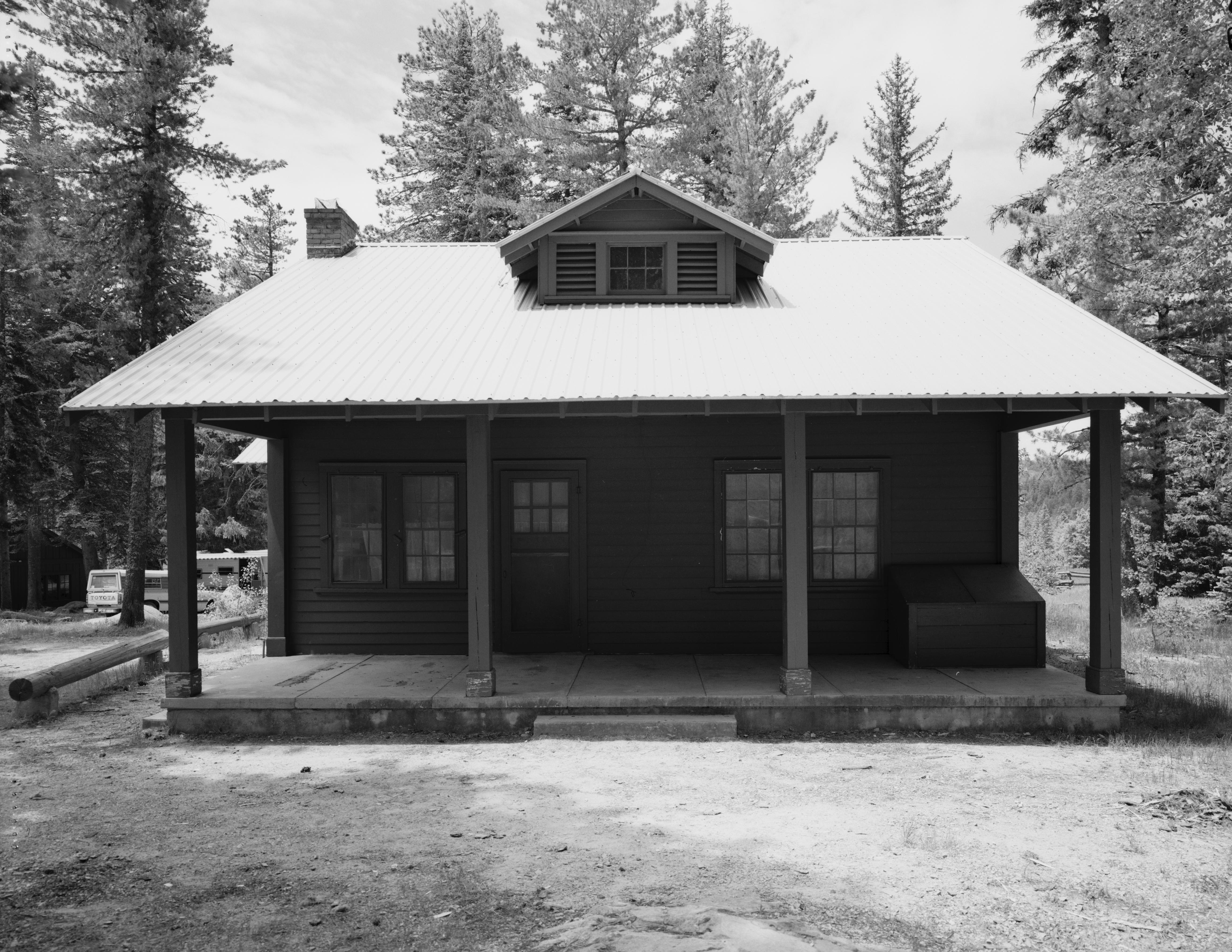
Columbine Work Station

- Marijilda Canyon Prehistoric Archeological District – Address Restricted – Listed in the National Register of Historic Places on October 2, 1988, reference: #88001572.
- Oak Draw Archeological District – Address Restricted – Listed in the National Register of Historic Places on November 25, 1992, reference: #92001564.
- Kearny Campsite and Trail – Northeast of Safford off U.S. Route 666 – Listed in the National Register of Historic Places on October 9, 1974, reference: #74000454.
- Columbine Work Station – State Route 366 southwest of Safford in the Coronado National Forest – Listed in the National Register of Historic Places on June 10, 1993, reference: #93000516.

== See also ==
- National Register of Historic Places listings in Graham County, Arizona
