= Senator Talley =

Senator Talley may refer to:

- Don Talley (1918–1982), Washington State Senate
- Scott Talley (born 1976), South Carolina State Senate
