= Talty =

Talty may refer to:

- Talty (surname), Irish surname
- Talty, Texas, United States, a city
- Tałty, village in Warmian-Masurian Voivodeship, Poland
