= Alan Thompson (Washington politician) =

American politician (1927–2019)

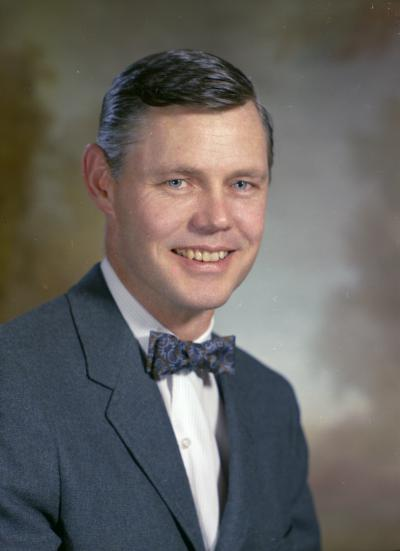
- Thompson in 1967

Chief Clerk of the Washington House of Representatives
- In office January 12, 1987 – December 31, 1993
- Preceded by: Denny Heck
- Succeeded by: Marilyn Showalter

Member of the Washington Senate from the 18th district
- In office November 16, 1982 – November 19, 1986
- Preceded by: Don Talley
- Succeeded by: Joe Tanner

Member of the Washington House of Representatives from the 18th district
- In office January 11, 1965 – November 17, 1982
- Preceded by: H. D. Hadley
- Succeeded by: Oliver Ristuben

Personal details
- Born: Alan Craig Thompson; May 17, 1927 Geneva, Iowa, U.S.
- Died: July 28, 2019 (aged 92) Olympia, Washington, U.S.
- Party: Democratic
- Spouse: Barbara
- Occupation: Newspaper publisher

Alan Craig Thompson (May 17, 1927 – July 28, 2019) was an American politician and journalist in the state of Washington. He served in the Washington House of Representatives from 1965 to 1982 and the Washington State Senate from 1982 to 1986, as a Democrat. He was appointed to the Senate in November 1982 to replace the deceased Don Talley. He was also the Chief Clerk of the Washington House of Representatives from 1987 to 1993.
