= Tally =

Tally commonly refers to counting or to summation of a total amount, debt, or score. Tally may also refer to:

== People ==
=== Given name or nickname ===
- Tally Brown (1924–1989), American singer and actress
- Tally Gotliv (born 1975), Israeli lawyer and politician
- Tally Hall (soccer) (born 1985), American soccer player
- Tally Holmes, African-American tennis player in the 1910s and 1920s
- Tally Monastyryov (1939–2011), Soviet alpine skier
- Tally Sneddon (1914–1995), Scottish professional football wing half and manager
- Tally Stevens (1923–1995), head coach for Brigham Young University Cougars football team from 1959–1960
- Tallys, Brazilian attacking midfielder Tallys Machado de Oliveira (born 1987)

=== Surname ===
- Harry Tally (1866–1939), American singer
- Lura S. Tally (1921–2012), American politician
- Robert Tally (born 1969), American literary critic
- Ted Tally (born 1952), American playwright and screenwriter
- Thomas Lincoln Tally (1861–1945), American pioneering motion picture theater proprietor and movie producer
- William Tally, American engineer and former CTO of Saleen, Inc

== Arts and entertainment ==
=== Fictional characters ===
- Tally Man, two fictional characters in the DC Universe
- Tally Wong, a Celebrity Deathmatch character
- Tally Youngblood, a fictional character in the Uglies series, written by Scott Westerfeld

=== Music ===
- Tally (album), by Body Type, 2026
- "Tally" (song), by Blackpink from Born Pink, 2022
- "Tally", a song by Midwxst and Denzel Curry, 2023
- "Tally", a song by Twenty One Pilots from Breach, 2025

=== Paintings ===
- Tally (painting), a 1994 painting by Ellen Gallagher

== Brands and enterprises ==
- Tally (company), a defunct printer company
- Tally Solutions, an Indian multinational financial accounting software company
- Tally Technologies, a debt management app in the U.S. and makers of the Tally app

== Other uses ==
- Tally (voting), an unofficial private observation of an election count
- Tallahassee, Florida, nicknamed Tally
- ASC Niarry Tally, a football club from Senegal
- Tally (cap), a ribbon on a sailor's cap
- Tally language, a form of unary language in computational complexity theory
- Tally (robot)

== See also ==
- Tally counter, a mechanical device used to maintain a linear count
- Tally light, a small signal-lamp on a television camera or monitor
- Tally marks, a form of numeral used in a unary numeral system, most useful in counting or tallying ongoing results, such as the score in a game or sport
- Tally sort, a computer science counting and sorting algorithm
- Tally stick, an ancient memory aid device to record and document numbers, quantities, or even messages
- Tally's War, an incident in 1863 in Iowa, in which pro-war individuals opened fire on a peace demonstration
- Talley (disambiguation)
