= Talley (surname) =

Talley is a surname. Notable people with the name include:

- André Leon Talley (1948–2022), American journalist
- Andy Talley (born 1943), American football coach
- Archie Talley (born 1953), American basketball player
- Ben Talley (born 1972), American football player
- Brent Talley (born 1962), American politician
- Carey Talley (born 1976), American soccer player
- Darryl Talley (born 1960), American football player
- David Talley (born 1950), American Roman Catholic bishop
- Don Talley (1918–1982), American politician
- Edward R. Talley (1890–1950), American soldier
- Emma Talley (born 1994), American golfer
- Fred Talley (born 1980), American football player
- Gary Talley (born 1947), American singer
- James Talley (born 1944), American singer
- Jeffrey W. Talley, American soldier
- Jeralean Talley (1899–2015), American supercentenarian
- Jill Talley (born 1962), American actress
- Julian Talley (born 1989), American football player
- Kevin Talley (born 1979), American heavy metal drummer
- Keyth Talley (born 1990), American swimmer
- Kirk Talley (born 1958), American singer
- Kirk Talley (American football) (born 1959), American football coach
- Lynne Talley (born 1954), American oceanographer
- Marcia Talley (born 1943), American novelist
- Marion Talley (1906–1983), American operatic soprano
- Nedra Talley (1946–2026), American singer
- Nicholas Talley, Australian academic
- Ronald Talley (born 1986), American football player
- Steve Talley (born 1981), American actor
- Thomas W. Talley (1870–1952), American chemist
- Troy Talley, American politician
- Wilbur B. Talley, American architect
- William Cooper Talley (1831–1903), American politician

== See also ==
- Tully (surname)
- Tilley (surname)
