= William Tally =

American engineer

William (Bill) Tally is an American engineer and former CTO of Saleen, Inc. Tally was responsible for heading the development of the powertrain of the Saleen S7, the first modern American supercar.

== Career ==
Tally began his automotive career as a mechanic working with the Kel Carruthers AMA Grand National 500cc World Championship factory Yamaha racing team in 1975. In the following years, he was involved in race engineering efforts in CART and a number of other racing series. Billy also worked for Don Vesco for years during the 90's, not only building racing engines, but as a key member of the LSR (land speed record) team through all developmental stages that began with dual internal combustion engines, to its final incarnation as a turbine powered world land speed record holder for a wheel driven vehicle. He possesses excellent engineering skills, coupled with his hard driving work ethic and unique ability as an efficient problem solver. Additionally, he has a severe fear of snakes, as evidenced by his horrified reaction at his discovery of a dead rattlesnake that was placed in a UPS box and re-sealed as if it was a recent delivery to the shop. In 1996, Tally caught the eye of Steve Saleen while heading a number of NASCAR engine engineering projects. Tally joined Saleen in 1998 to develop the 7.0L engine that was eventually used to power the Saleen S7. Before becoming CTO at Saleen, Tally had served in the positions of S7 program Chief Engineer, VP of Engineering, and VP of Advanced Engineering. While at Saleen, Tally headed the development of Saleen's Series VI supercharger, a patented supercharger design.

In June 2007, Tally joined ZX Automobile Company of North America, Inc., a subsidiary of China America Cooperative Automotive in the position of CTO. With the bankruptcy of Chamco, Tally became CTO and Chief Engineer at Techco International, an automotive products engineering and manufacturing firm. A key project he undertook at Techco was the development of Techco's 3 Liter asymmetric twin-screw Supercharger, integrating high-efficiency gas-compression technology first developed by manufacturers of industrial air compressors such as Atlas Copco, Ingersoll Rand, and Kaeser Kompressoren.
