= Talty (surname) =

Talty is a surname found in County Clare, Ireland. It is an Anglicized form of the Gaelic "Ó Tailtigh" ‘descendant of Tailteach’. Other surnames with the same origin are Tully, Tally, MacTully, MacAtilla, Flood and possibly Floyd. The Ó Tailtigh family were physicians to the O'Conors, Kings of Connacht and also to the O'Reillys of Breffny in County Cavan.

== Notable people ==
- Ben Talty, England international rugby league footballer
- Brian Talty (born 1955), Irish Gaelic football player
- Jack Talty, Irish musician, composer and producer
- Martin Talty
- Morgan Talty (born 1991), American writer
- Stephan Talty (born c. 1960), Irish American journalist and author
