= William Talley House =

William Talley House may refer to:

- William Talley House (Safford, Arizona), listed on the NRHP in Arizona
- William Talley House (New Castle County, Delaware), listed on the NRHP in New Castle County, Delaware (Wilmington postal address, Philadelphia metropolitan area)
