= Kaeser =

Kaeser and Käser are the German and Swiss forms, respectively, of the same German-language surname, referring to a maker or seller of cheese (compare English Cheeseman). Notable people with the surname include:

- Adrian Käser, Swiss sidecarcross World Champion
- Angelika Dreock-Käser, German Para-cyclist
- Elisabeth Käser (born 1951), Swiss slalom canoeist
- H. J. Kaeser (1904 – 1965), German Jewish author
- Helmut Käser (1912 – 1994), Swiss general secretary of FIFA
- Joe Kaeser (born 1957), German CEO of Siemens
- Viviane Käser (born 1985), Swiss figure skater
