= William Talley House (Safford, Arizona) =

Historic house in Arizona, United States

- U.S. National Register of Historic Places
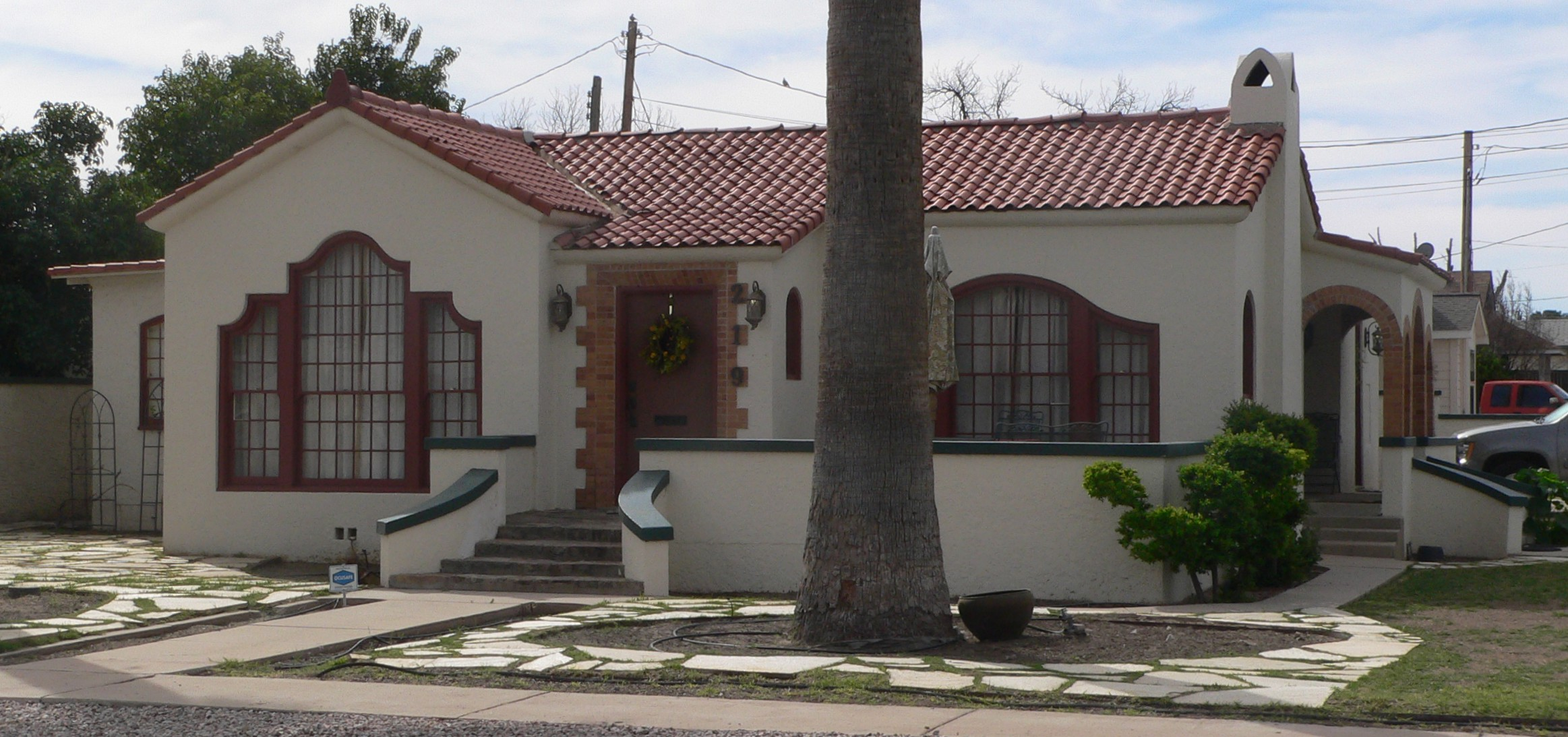

- Location within Arizona Location within the United States
- Location: 219 Eleventh St., Safford, Arizona
- Coordinates: 32.827337°N 109.709788°W
- Area: less than one acre
- Built: 1928
- Architect: Talley, William
- Architectural style: Mission/Spanish Revival, Spanish Colonial Revival
- MPS: Safford MRA
- NRHP reference No.: 87002581
- Added to NRHP: February 9, 1988

The William Talley House in Safford, Arizona was built in 1928. It was listed on the National Register of Historic Places in 1988.

It was deemed significant as the home of Safford lumberman William Talley, and as the finest example of Spanish Colonial Revival style in Safford.

== See also ==
- Hugh Talley House, also NRHP-listed in Safford, Arizona
- William Talley House (New Castle County, Delaware), NRHP-listed in New Castle County, Delaware (Wilmington postal address)
