= Don Talley =

American politician

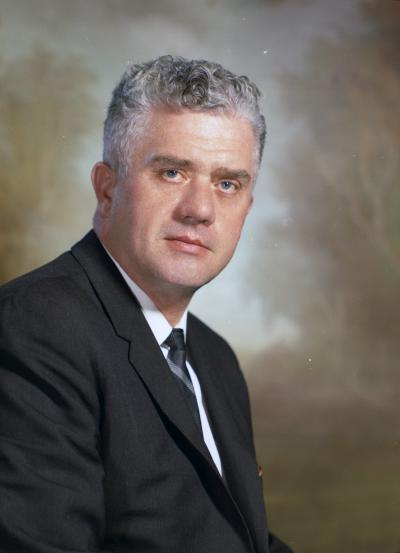
- Talley in 1967

Member of the Washington Senate from the 18th district
- In office January 14, 1957 – September 23, 1986
- Preceded by: Thomas C. Hall
- Succeeded by: Alan Thompson

Personal details
- Born: December 12, 1918 Tacoma, Washington, U.S.
- Died: September 23, 1982 (aged 63) Auburn, Washington, U.S.
- Party: Democratic

Don L. Talley (December 12, 1918 – September 23, 1982) was an American politician in the state of Washington. He served in the Washington State Senate from 1957 to 1982. He died of a heart attack in 1982.
