= Henry O. Jaastad =

American politician and architect (1872–1965)

Mayor of Tucson, Arizona
- In office 1933–1947
- Preceded by: George K. Smith
- Succeeded by: Elbert Thomson Houston

Personal details
- Born: January 1, 1872 Norway
- Died: January 1, 1965 (aged 93) Tucson, Arizona
- Resting place: Evergreen Cemetery, Tucson, Arizona
- Party: Democratic Party
- Education: University of Arizona
- Profession: Architect

Henry O. Jaastad (1872–1965) was an influential Tucson, Arizona architect. His firm created over 500 buildings and Jaastad was Mayor of Tucson for 14 years. A number of his works are listed on the U.S. National Register of Historic Places for their architecture.

== Personal information ==
Jaastad was born in Norway in 1872. In 1886 – at age 14 – he emigrated to the United States. In 1902, as a skilled journeyman carpenter, he worked on the Willard Hotel, Owl's Club, and Desert Botanical laboratories in Tucson, Arizona. In that same year, Jaastad was able to start his own contractor business where he would design small but remarkable residential buildings for private individuals. He worked in neighborhoods within Armory Park, West University, and North Speedway. In 1904, two years later, Jaastad became a naturalized citizen of the US. In 1908, he completed extensive courses in architecture and he enrolled in the University of Arizona where he was a part of an electrical engineering program. In 1922, Jaastad officially became a registered architect, and held his architecture license until 1959.

== Works ==
Works include (with attribution, which varies):

=== Extant buildings ===
- Patagonia City Hall (1900), Patagonia, Arizona.
- Diego Valencia House (1907), 432-43 South Convent Avenue, Barrio Viejo, Tucson.
- Reilly Funeral Home (1908), 102 East Pennington Street, Tucson.
- Brick Row House (1909), 440-446 South Convent Avenue, Barrio Viejo, Tucson.
- Old Nogales City Hall and Fire Station (1914), 136 Grand Ave and/or 223 Grand Ave. Nogales (Jaastad, Henry O.), NRHP-listed
- Odd Fellows Hall (1914), 135 South 6th Avenue, Armory Park, Tucson. (credited to Jaastad, but more likely designed by Ely Blount while working in Jaastad's office)
- Manning-Johnson House (1916), 455 West Paseo Redondo, El Presidio, Tucson. (Image) Owned many years by Emery and Ann-Eve Johnson and now occupied by a law firm which has removed most of the residence's noted original grandeur and historical interior and exterior features.
- Safford Middle School (1918), 200 East 13th Street, Armory Park, Tucson.
- Paul Lawrence Dunbar 1-9 School (1918), 325 West 2nd Street, Dunbar Spring, Tucson.
- Commercial Building (1918), 41-47 South 6th Avenue.
- Arizona Bank and Trust (1920), 429 Main Safford, Arizona (Jaastad, H.O.), NRHP-listed
- Tucson Medical Center Buildings (1926–27): Erickson House, Arizona Patio Building, Education Building (to be demolished), 4 Court Buildings (to be demolished).
- Casa Grande Woman's Club Building (1924), NRHP-listed
- Tucson High School and Vocational Educational Building (1924), Lyman & Place/Henry Haastad, Associate.
- Saint Augustine Cathedral (façade remodel 1929)
- Grace Lutheran Church (1949)
- Arizona Hotel, 31-47 N. Sixth Ave., 135 E. Tenth St. Tucson, (Jaastad, Henry O.), NRHP-listed
- Copper Bell Bed and Breakfast, 25 N. Westmoreland Ave. Tucson, AZ (Jaastad, Henrik Olsen), NRHP-listed
- Our Lady of the Blessed Sacrament Church, 914 Sullivan St. Miami, AZ (Jaastad, Henry O.), NRHP-listed
- Safford High School, 520 Eleventh St. Safford, Arizona (Jaastad, H.O.), NRHP-listed
- University Heights Elementary School, 1201 N. Park Ave. Tucson, AZ (Jaastad, Henry Olson), NRHP-listed

=== Demolished buildings ===
- University Methodist Episcopal Church (1924) Demolished 1987
- El Conquistador Hotel (1928)
- Safford High School (original) 1915 Demolished mid 1990s
- Buena Vista Hotel (1928), 322 Main Safford, Arizona (Jaastad, H.O.), demolished by 2015, NRHP-listed

== Sources ==
- Nequette, Anne M. and Jeffery, R. Brooks. A Guide to Tucson Architecture. University of Arizona Press 2002.
- Regan, Margaret. "Remembering Rockfellow: Although Her Name is all but Forgotten, Tucson's First Female Architect Left Her Mark". Tucson Weekly Jan. 31, 2000.
- Regan, Margaret. "Class Struggle", Tucson Weekly. December 2, 1999.
