= Safford High School (historic) =

Former school in Graham County, Arizona

- U.S. National Register of Historic Places
- Old Safford High School (1915)

- Location within Arizona Location within the United States
- Location: 520 Eleventh St., Safford, Arizona
- Coordinates: 32°49′41″N 109°42′47″W
- Area: less than one acre
- Built: 1915
- Architect: Henry Jaastad
- Architectural style: Mission style/Spanish Revival
- MPS: Safford MRA
- NRHP reference No.: 87002577
- Added to NRHP: February 9, 1988

The Safford High School building, which was located where Safford Middle School is currently located, opened to students on September 13, 1915. It was designed by Henry O. Jaastad. It served as the main high school building through the 1979–80 school year. Over the years other buildings were built. This included the WPA-built Baker Stadium, which served as the home of the Safford Bulldogs from 1938 through the 1986 season; a gymnasium in 1943, which allowed the previous gym to be retrofitted into an auditorium; and the other classroom buildings. This included a library built in the 1960s. It is noted that, during this period, the baseball stadium was at the old bleachers by Lafe Nelson School as was the field house for the football and wrestling teams.

Once the high school moved to its current campus, the original Safford Junior High School, which had its own building adjacent to the high school, was torn down in 1980. Safford Junior High, then later Middle, School occupied the main building and the gymnasium until the mid-1990s, when concerns for those buildings' safety and revelations of poor construction quality prompted them to be razed and replaced, outweighing concerns of historical value and the cost of a refurbishment. The 1915 building was listed on the National Register of Historic Places on February 9, 1988. It remains listed, apparently erroneously as the building is gone. Ultimately, shoddy construction was also the reason that the 1943 gymnasium was torn down in the 1990s. Baker Stadium is still used as the home field for middle school football.
