= Safford Unified School District v. Redding =

- Supreme Court of the United States

Argued April 21, 2009 Decided June 25, 2009
- Full case name: Safford Unified School District #1, et al. v. April Redding
- Docket no.: 08-479
- Citations: 557 U.S. 364 (more) 129 S. Ct. 2633; 174 L. Ed. 2d 354; 77 U.S.L.W. 4591; 245 Ed. Law Rep. 626; 09 Cal. Daily Op. Serv. 7974; 2009 Daily Journal D.A.R. 9383; 21 Fla. L. Weekly Fed. S 1011
- Argument: Oral argument
- Opinion announcement: Opinion announcement

Case history
- Prior: Summary judgment affirmed, 504 F.3d 828 (9th Cir. 2007); rehearing en banc granted, 514 F.3d 1383 (2008); reversed, 531 F.3d 1071 (9th Cir. 2008); cert. granted, 555 U.S. 1130 (2009).

Holding
- (1) The search of Redding's underwear violated the Fourth Amendment. (2) Petitioners are protected from liability by qualified immunity. (3) The issue of the school district's liability should be addressed on remand.

Court membership
- Chief Justice John Roberts Associate Justices John P. Stevens · Antonin Scalia; Anthony Kennedy · David Souter; Clarence Thomas · Ruth Bader Ginsburg; Stephen Breyer · Samuel Alito

Case opinions
- Majority: Souter, joined by Roberts, Scalia, Kennedy, Breyer, Alito; Stevens, Ginsburg (Parts I–III)
- Concur/dissent: Stevens, joined by Ginsburg
- Concur/dissent: Ginsburg
- Concur/dissent: Thomas

Laws applied
- U.S. Const. amend. IV

Safford Unified School District v. Redding, 557 U.S. 364 (2009), was a case in which the Supreme Court of the United States held that a strip search of a middle school student by school officials violated the Fourth Amendment to the U.S. Constitution, which prohibits unreasonable searches and seizures.

On October 8, 2003, the assistant principal of Safford Middle School in Safford, Arizona, informed 13-year-old Savana Redding that another student had accused her of distributing prescription-strength ibuprofen, which was disallowed without prior permission by school rules. Redding denied this accusation, and after a search of her belongings did not reveal any pills, school officials instructed her to remove her outer clothing and pull out her bra and underpants, which also did not reveal any pills.

Redding's mother sued the Safford Unified School District and the school officials who searched her daughter, arguing that they had violated the Fourth Amendment. On June 25, 2009, in an 8–1 decision authored by Justice David Souter, (Note: The vote in the case was 8–1 with respect to the holding that the search of Redding violated the Fourth Amendment and 7–2 with respect to the holding that the school officials were entitled to qualified immunity.) the Supreme Court held that the search failed to meet the "reasonable suspicion" standard for searches of students in a school setting established by the Court in New Jersey v. T. L. O. (1985), stating that the school lacked reasons to suspect either that the drugs presented a danger or that they were concealed in her underwear. However, the Court also found that because there was sufficient doubt as to whether the law was clearly established at the time of the search, the school officials were shielded from liability by qualified immunity.

The case garnered nationwide interest and sparked debates over the extent to which school officials should enforce zero-tolerance policies in schools. Justice Ruth Bader Ginsburg was the only female justice at the time and discussed the case in an interview while a decision was still pending; observers have described Ginsburg's role in the case as emphasizing the need for more diversity on the Supreme Court.

== Background ==
=== Prior case law ===
The Fourth Amendment to the United States Constitution prohibits unreasonable searches and seizures by the federal government, and the Fourteenth Amendment extends this prohibition to state governments under the incorporation doctrine. In most cases, the Fourth Amendment requires government officials to have probable cause in order to conduct a search. In the context of searches of children by school officials, however, the U.S. Supreme Court held in New Jersey v. T. L. O. (1985) that the public interest in maintaining the school environment "'is best served by a Fourth Amendment standard of reasonableness that stops short of probable cause'".

Instead, in T. L. O. the Court held that the reasonableness standard for searches conducted by school officials in a school environment is that of "reasonable suspicion". Additionally, the Court stated in T. L. O. that "a school search 'will be permissible in its scope when the measures adopted are reasonably related to the objectives of the search and not excessively intrusive in light of the age and sex of the student and the nature of the infraction'". In general, the doctrine of qualified immunity protects government officials, including school officials, from facing individual liability for unreasonable searches, unless their conduct violated law that was "clearly established" at the time of the search.

=== Facts of the case ===
On October 8, 2003, Kerry Wilson, the assistant principal of Safford Middle School in Safford, Arizona, asked 13-year-old student Savana Redding to come to his office. Wilson showed Redding a day planner which had "several knives, lighters, a permanent marker, and a cigarette" inside, and he asked if it was hers. Redding stated that the planner belonged to her, but not any of the items inside. She also stated that she had lent the planner to her friend, Marissa Glines, a few days beforehand.

Wilson then showed Redding "four white prescription-strength ibuprofen 400-mg pills, and one over-the-counter blue naproxen 200-mg pill, all used for pain and inflammation but banned under school rules without advanced permission". Wilson informed her that someone had reported her for distributing these pills to other students, which Redding denied. Redding agreed to let Wilson and an administrative assistant named Helen Romero search her backpack, which did not reveal any pills. At Wilson's direction, Romero then took Redding to the office of Peggy Schwallier, the school nurse, where Romero and Schwallier asked Redding to remove her jacket, socks, and shoes. They then asked her to remove her t-shirt and stretch pants, neither of which had pockets. Finally, Redding "was told to pull her bra out and to the side and shake it, and to pull out the elastic on her underpants, thus exposing her breasts and pelvic area to some degree". The search did not reveal any pills.

A week before Redding was searched, another student had reported to Wilson that "certain students were bringing drugs and weapons on campus", and furthermore, the student reported becoming sick after taking pills obtained from a classmate. Earlier on the morning of Redding’s search, the same student gave Wilson a white pill, later identified by Schwallier as prescription-strength ibuprofen, and told him that other students were going to take the pills at lunch. The student claimed that Marissa Glines had given him the pills. He also told the principal that he attended a party at Redding’s house at which alcohol was served to his peers.

Wilson then took Marissa Glines out of class and, in the presence of Helen Romero, asked her to "turn out her pockets and open her wallet", which "produced a blue pill, several white ones, and a razor blade". Glines identified Savana Redding as the person who had supplied her with the drugs. When Wilson asked Glines about the day planner, she denied knowledge about its contents. Wilson then instructed Romero and Schwallier to search Glines' bra and underpants, which revealed no additional pills. It was at this point when Wilson called Redding into his office.

=== Lower court proceedings ===
April Redding, Savana Redding's mother, sued Wilson, Romero, Schwallier, and the Safford Unified School District, arguing that they had conducted an unreasonable strip search in violation of the Fourth Amendment. The school officials moved for summary judgment, arguing that they were entitled to qualified immunity. The U.S. District Court for the District of Arizona granted this motion, holding that the school officials did not violate the Fourth Amendment, and a panel of the U.S. Court of Appeals for the Ninth Circuit affirmed on September 21, 2007. At this point, the American Civil Liberties Union joined the case as co-counsel for Redding. On July 11, 2008, after rehearing the case en banc, the Ninth Circuit reversed the panel, holding in a closely divided decision that the search violated the Fourth Amendment and that assistant principal Wilson was not entitled to qualified immunity. The en banc Ninth Circuit affirmed that defendants Romero and Schwallier were entitled to qualified immunity because "they had not acted as independent decisionmakers".

== Supreme Court ==
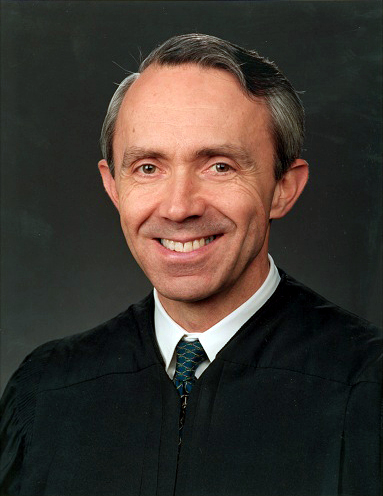
Justice David Souter authored the majority opinion in Safford Unified School District v. Redding.

The school officials filed a petition for a writ of certiorari with the Supreme Court, which granted certiorari on January 16, 2009, in order to review two questions: (1) "whether the Fourth Amendment prohibits public school officials from conducting a search of a student suspected of possessing and distributing a prescription drug on campus in violation of school policy", and (2) "whether the Ninth Circuit departed from established principles of qualified immunity in holding that a public school administrator may be liable in a damages lawsuit under 42 U.S.C. § 1983 for conducting a search of a student suspected of possessing and distributing a prescription drug on campus".

=== Opinion of the Court ===
Justice David Souter delivered the opinion of the Court, which affirmed the Ninth Circuit in part, reversed in part, and remanded. In a vote of 8–1, the Court affirmed the Ninth Circuit's judgment that the search of Redding violated the Fourth Amendment; Justice Clarence Thomas would have held that the search did not violate the Fourth Amendment. In a vote of 7–2, the Court reversed the Ninth Circuit's judgment with respect to qualified immunity, holding that the school officials were entitled to qualified immunity because the search's unconstitutionality was not clearly established at the time of the violation; Justices John Paul Stevens and Ruth Bader Ginsburg would have held that the assistant principal was not entitled to qualified immunity.

==== Fourth Amendment ====
In his analysis of the Fourth Amendment, Souter reiterated the holding in New Jersey v. T. L. O. that the validity of school searches merely requires a standard of "reasonable suspicion", not the "probable cause" standard ordinarily used by law enforcement officers. In terms of the knowledge required to meet that threshold, this calls for only a "moderate chance" of finding the expected evidence, not at "fair probability" or "substantial chance" associated with probable cause. Souter then recounted the facts of the case, and he concluded that the school officials had conducted a "strip search", stating that "both subjective and reasonable societal expectations of personal privacy support the treatment of such a search as categorically distinct, requiring distinct elements of justification on the part of school authorities for going beyond a search of outer clothing and belongings".

Souter reiterated that in T. L. O., the Court had held that the scope of a school search "will be permissible ... when it is 'not excessively intrusive in light of the age and sex of the student and the nature of the infraction". From this, he concluded that in Redding's case, "the content of the suspicion failed to match the degree of intrusion" because assistant principal Wilson "must have been aware of the nature and limited threat of the specific drugs he was searching for". Additionally, Wilson could not "have suspected that Savana was hiding common painkillers in her underwear". "In sum," wrote Souter, "what was missing from the suspected facts that pointed to Savana was any indication of danger to the students from the power of the drugs or their quantity, and any reason to suppose that Savana was carrying pills in her underwear." For these reasons, the strip search of Redding was unreasonable and violated the Fourth Amendment.

==== Qualified immunity ====
Quoting Pearson v. Callahan (2009), Souter stated that "a school official searching a student is 'entitled to qualified immunity where clearly established law does not show that the search violated the Fourth Amendment'". Although the Court explicitly held that the strip search of Redding did violate the Fourth Amendment, Souter acknowledged that "lower courts have reached divergent conclusions regarding how the T. L. O. standard applies to such searches", such as (but not limited to) the minority of the en banc Ninth Circuit in this case, as well as the Sixth Circuit, which had previously "upheld a strip search of a high school student for a drug, without any suspicion that drugs were hidden next to her body".

Souter commented that "the cases viewing school strip searches differently from the way we see them are numerous enough, with well-reasoned majority and dissenting opinions, to counsel doubt that we were sufficiently clear in the prior statement of law". Qualified immunity is therefore warranted for the school officials in the case. Souter clarified that the Court's "conclusions here do not resolve, however, the question of the liability of petitioner Safford Unified School District #1 under Monell v. New York City Dept. of Social Servs., a claim the Ninth Circuit did not address". The Court remanded the case back to the lower courts in order for them to consider the Monell claim.

=== Concurrence and dissent ===
Justice John Paul Stevens filed an opinion that was joined by Justice Ruth Bader Ginsburg, concurring that the search violated the Fourth Amendment, but dissenting from the view that the school officials were entitled to qualified immunity. Stevens would have denied qualified immunity to assistant principal Wilson, writing that "this is, in essence, a case in which clearly established law meets clearly outrageous conduct". He disagreed that the "seemingly divergent views" among lower courts of appeals about T. L. O.’s application to strip searches justifies extending qualified immunity, stating that "the clarity of a well-established right should not depend on whether jurists have misread our precedents". Justice Stevens would have affirmed the Ninth Circuit's decision "in its entirety".

In a separate opinion, Justice Ginsburg further elaborated on why she thought qualified immunity was inappropriate in this case. Ginsburg distinguished the facts of Redding from that of T. L. O.: "In contrast to T. L. O., where a teacher discovered a student smoking in the lavatory, and where the search was confined to the student’s purse, the search of Redding involved her body and rested on the bare accusation of another student whose reliability the Assistant Principal had no reason to trust." In Ginsburg's view, "'the nature of the [supposed] infraction,' the slim basis for suspecting Savana Redding, and her 'age and sex', establish beyond doubt that Assistant Principal Wilson's order cannot be reconciled with this Court's opinion in T. L. O. Wilson's treatment of Redding was abusive, and it was not reasonable for him to believe that the law permitted it."

Justice Clarence Thomas filed an opinion concurring in the judgment with respect to granting qualified immunity and dissenting with respect to the Fourth Amendment. Thomas would have held that the search did not violate the Fourth Amendment. All parties agreed that the school had "reasonable suspicion that Redding was in possession of drugs in violation of these policies," and whereas the majority believed this justified only the first search, Thomas concluded it "justified a search extending to any area where small pills could be concealed." In his opinion, Thomas warned that the majority's decision could backfire: "Redding would not have been the first person to conceal pills in her undergarments. Nor will she be the last after today's decision, which announces the safest place to secrete contraband in school."

== Analysis ==
Lewis R. Katz, a professor at Case Western Reserve University School of Law, and Carl J. Mazzone jointly wrote an analysis published by the Case Western Reserve Law Review, where they commented that T. L. O. had "opened the floodgates for school strip searches" because "some schools and lower courts stopped considering strip searches to be different in kind or more serious intrusions than other school searches of a student's possessions". Katz and Mazzone described the Court's decision in Redding as "a step in the right direction, clarifying T. L. O. and instructing that school strip searches are to be treated as extraordinary intrusions supported by individualized reasonable suspicion and subject to the proportionality standard".

=== Effect on school administrators ===
Dennis D. Parker, the Director of the ACLU Racial Justice Program, wrote an article published in the New York Law School Law Review, in which he commented that "the Redding majority elected not to provide unbridled discretion to school authorities in the name of establishing school safety, and by doing so, provided for a means of examining the reasonableness of individual decisions by school administrators". Parker added, "For the children seeking to escape the 'school-to-prison pipeline', a collection of policies that direct children out of the classroom and into the courthouse and the jail cell, the Redding decision is a first step in achieving positive educational outcomes."

In an analysis published by the Seton Hall Law Review, Timothy J. Petty stated that Redding had "clarified T. L. O. by adding two factors to the second prong, requiring that the item in question present a threat and that the school officials have a reasonable belief that the item is located in the student's undergarments". Petty concluded that "the application of these factors to the reasonableness requirement indicate that strip searches should rarely be found reasonable under the Fourth Amendment". Katz and Mazzone also commented on this clarification of T. L. O., stating that the Court had done so "by acknowledging that 'reasonable suspicion' is a sliding scale".

==== Definition of a strip search ====
Although they acknowledged Redding as a "step in the right direction", Katz and Mazzone stated that the Supreme Court "left unanswered some key questions regarding strip searches that will not only lead to uncertainty among both school administrators and lower courts but also guarantee future litigation". One such question posed by Katz and Mazzone was "what actually constitutes a strip search", arguing that the Court failed to provide a clear definition and suggesting that "the definition of a strip search necessarily differs between a boy and a girl". Additionally, Katz and Mazzone stated that "Redding, however, did not address the reasonableness of conducting a strip search when officials fail to find the object in the course of a less intrusive search". Strip searches, they acknowledged, "remain a tool available to schools" under the Court's decision.

The Harvard Journal of Law & Gender published a commentary by Laura Jarrett, who stated that "although the majority correctly found the strip search of Savana Redding excessively intrusive under the circumstances, one major aspect of the standard set forth in T. L. O. was neither fully explained nor applied by the Court in Redding—namely, the role sex plays in evaluating the legality of a strip search". According to Jarrett, "One is left to wonder if the Justices would have reached the same outcome if Savana had been a 13-year-old boy, because the majority does not provide any indication whether adolescent boys and girls are equally vulnerable to such intrusive searches". Jarrett commented that the Court's "failure to address in Redding the sex prong required under T. L. O. might leave the case open to potentially undesired interpretations in the future" and that this may "place school officials in a position to again receive immunity for such abuses of students' rights".

=== Effect on qualified immunity ===
In an article published in the Brigham Young University Journal of Public Law, Eric W. Clarke wrote that "a likely result of Safford is that school officials now have more protections than qualified immunity normally grants". However, Clarke stated that this is not necessarily inappropriate, arguing that school officials "should have a broader shield than other government actors because their principal role is not law enforcement but rather educating the youth", but adding that "courts should explicitly state that school officials are granted a higher protection from civil suit than other government officials", as this "could cause a slippery slope where other government officials asserting qualified immunity could be granted the additional protections of [school officials]".

Clarke commented that T. L. O. had granted teachers "near-absolute immunity" because "qualified immunity is based on a reasonable understanding of the law, and under T. L. O., school officials are not expected to have any understanding of the law". However, Clarke concluded that "Safford may change the rule" such that it "would solve the near-absolute-immunity problem, but would also be bad law because it would unrealistically expect school officials to remain abreast of Fourth Amendment law". According to Clarke, "It is now unclear how the new standard for school searches will affect qualified immunity. The best solution is to grant school officials absolute immunity regarding school searches." Katz and Mazzone, on the other hand, directly criticized the Court's decision to grant qualified immunity to the assistant principal as "misguided", stating that "Wilson's actions defied the common sense one would expect in an experienced administrator".

== Reception ==
=== Reactions ===
After the decision was announced, Adam Liptak wrote an article published in The New York Times, in which he stated that the case "had attracted national attention and gave rise to an intense debate over how much leeway school officials should have in enforcing zero-tolerance policies for drugs and violence". According to Liptak, "Some parents were outraged by the intrusiveness of the search, while others worried about tying the hands of school officials charged with keeping their children safe." Savana Redding commented in an interview with Liptak that she was "'pretty excited'" by the Court's decision. "'It makes me feel good,' she said, 'that they recognized that it was against my rights and that it most likely won’t happen to anyone else.'" Redding had previously stated in an affidavit that "the strip search was the most humiliating experience I have ever had" and that "I held my head down so that they could not see that I was about to cry".

Matthew W. Wright, the lawyer that argued for the school district in the Supreme Court, "said that the decision 'offers little clarification' concerning when such searches are allowed and that it could have dangerous consequences". According to Wright, "The decision unduly limits 'the ability of school officials to protect students from the harmful effects of drugs and weapons on school campuses.'" Adam Wolf, the attorney for the American Civil Liberties Union who argued for Redding in the Supreme Court, praised the Court's decision, commenting, "When parents send their kids to school, they can now breathe a sigh of relief they will not end up naked before school officials." On the other hand, Francisco Negron, general counsel for the National School Boards Association, criticized the decision as lacking clarity, stating that "The home medicine cabinet now poses a serious threat to students, who may take those medications for abusive purposes. That's a problem schools are trying to stem. How they determine now whether the drug is dangerous, whether it's not dangerous – that kind of clarity and that kind of guidance, the court did not give us."

=== Role of Justice Ginsburg ===
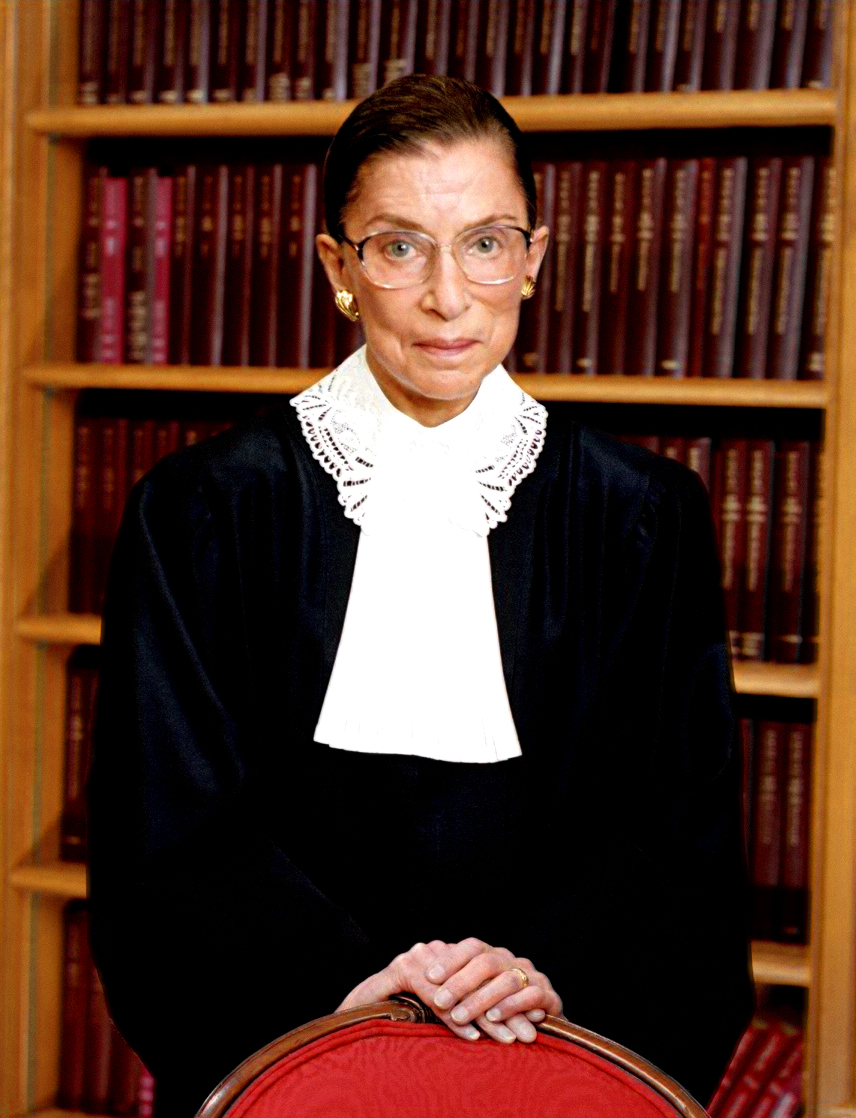
Justice Ruth Bader Ginsburg (photographed here circa 2006) was the only female member of the Supreme Court that decided Redding. Some journalists later described her role in the case as emphasizing the need for a more diverse Court.

At the time the Supreme Court decided Redding, Justice Ruth Bader Ginsburg was the only female member of the Court. Liptak commented that the case had "revealed a gender fault line at the court", referring to an article published in USA Today, where journalist Joan Biskupic stated Ginsburg's "status as the court's lone woman was especially poignant" in the case of Redding. Biskupic recalled that at the oral argument for the case, Justice Stephen Breyer had said he "had a hard time understanding the girl's claim that her rights had been violated"; in response, "Ginsburg retorted that school officials had directed Redding 'to shake (her) bra out, to shake, shake, stretch the top of (her) pants.'"

In an interview with USA Today in May 2009, while a decision in the case was still pending, Ginsburg stated that her colleagues had "never been a 13-year-old girl" and that "It's a very sensitive age for a girl. I didn't think that my colleagues, some of them, quite understood." Ginsburg added: "Maybe a 13-year-old boy in a locker room doesn't have that same feeling about his body. But a girl who's just at the age where she is developing, whether she has developed a lot ... or ... has not developed at all (might be) embarrassed about that." Justice Sonia Sotomayor, who joined the Court in August 2009, has also pointed to the case as emphasizing the need for more diversity on the Supreme Court.

In September 2020, following Ginsburg's death, Valerie Strauss wrote an article published in The Washington Post, which described the Redding case as serving "to underscore the humanity with which [Justice Ginsburg] approached her decisions and why many court watchers say it is so important for the Supreme Court to include a diverse group of justices with different experiences and points of view".

== See also ==
- Vernonia School District 47J v. Acton (1995)
- Board of Education v. Earls (2002)
- List of United States Supreme Court cases, volume 557
- List of United States Supreme Court cases
