= Arizona Hotel =

Arizona Hotel may refer to:

- Arizona Rancho, Holbrook, Arizona, also known as Arizona Hotel and listed on the National Register of Historic Places (NRHP)
- Arizona Hotel (Tucson, Arizona), NRHP-listed in Pima County
