= Buena Vista Hotel =

Buena Vista Hotel may refer to:

- Buena Vista Hotel (Safford, Arizona), listed on the NRHP in Arizona
- Buena Vista Hotel (Biloxi, Mississippi), listed on the NRHP in Mississippi
- Buena Vista Hotel (Stamford, Texas), listed on the NRHP in Texas
