= SUSD =

SUSD may refer to:

- Safford Unified School District, a school district in Safford, Arizona
- Sanders Unified School District, a school district in Apache County, Arizona
- Saratoga Union School District, a school district in Saratoga, California
- Saugus Union School District, a school district in Santa Clarita, California
- Scottsdale Unified School District, a school district in Phoenix, Arizona
- Shut Up & Sit Down, a board game review website and YouTube channel
- Stockton Unified School District, a school district in Stockton, California
- Sunnyside Unified School District, a school district in Tucson, Arizona

== See also ==
- Susd a village in Romania
