= Mount Graham High School =

School in Graham County, Arizona

Location
- 300 W Discovery Park Blvd; Safford, Arizona 85546; United States; 32°48′11″N 109°42′40″W

Information
- Type: Public Secondary
- Motto: We don't make it easier, we make it possible
- Established: 1994 (32 years ago)
- CEEB code: 030358
- Principal: E.J. Romero
- Teaching staff: 5.00 (FTE)
- Enrollment: 86 (2024–2025)
- Student to teacher ratio: 17.20
- Colors: Green and blue
- Mascot: Wolverines
- Website: mghs.saffordusd.com

Mount Graham High School (MGHS) is an alternative high school located in Safford, Arizona. It is part of the Safford Unified School District. It offers flexible schedules and childcare services for students with children. The school's mascot is the wolverine.

== Facilities ==
The school has a childcare facility, a kitchen for culinary teaching and cooking, and one main (big) classroom followed with a science classroom and a quiet classroom.

== See also ==
- Alternative school
- High school
- Safford Unified School District
