= Buena Vista Hotel (Safford, Arizona) =

- U.S. National Register of Historic Places
- Location within Arizona Location within the United States
- Location: 322 Main, Safford, Arizona
- Coordinates: 32°50′0″N 109°42′38″W
- Built: 1928
- Built by: McGinty Construction
- Architect: Jaastad, H.O.
- Architectural style: Mission/Spanish Revival
- MPS: Safford MRA
- NRHP reference No.: 87002560
- Added to NRHP: February 9, 1988

The Buena Vista Hotel was a historic hotel and entertainment center located in the downtown district of Safford, Arizona.

Built in 1928 at cost of $80,000, the 2-story, 46-room hotel was conceived by Fred and Minta Waughtal who previously owned and operated a cattle ranch in Dos Cabezas, as well as the nearby Olive Hotel, which later became the Safford Inn Hospital. The impetus for creating the Buena Vista was an anticipation of increased vehicular traffic upon the completion of the Coolidge Dam and a newly-paved highway from Globe to the Gila Valley.

When the Buena Vista Hotel opened on October 15, 1929, it was considered a luxurious retreat, where most of the rooms were adorned with commodious furnishings and private bathrooms. The hotel also featured an outdoor swimming pool and two bars; the Tap Room, and the Matador Room.

While the Tap Room was a traditional bar with a long, narrow dance floor for its patrons, the Matador Room was best known for its live performances, in particular, jazz and Country-western music. Many well-known and up-and-coming musicians appeared at the Matador Room over the years, such as Patsy Cline, Billy Walker, Lefty Frizzell, Glen Campbell, Willie Nelson and future Hee Haw star, Roy Clark.

The hotel closed after a resident set fire to the building on October 26, 1979, however, the restaurant and bar were salvaged and reopened as a gourmet restaurant named the Gaslight.

In 1987, the property was sold at an auction and remained dormant until the building was demolished in 1994, despite being listed on the National Register of Historic Places.

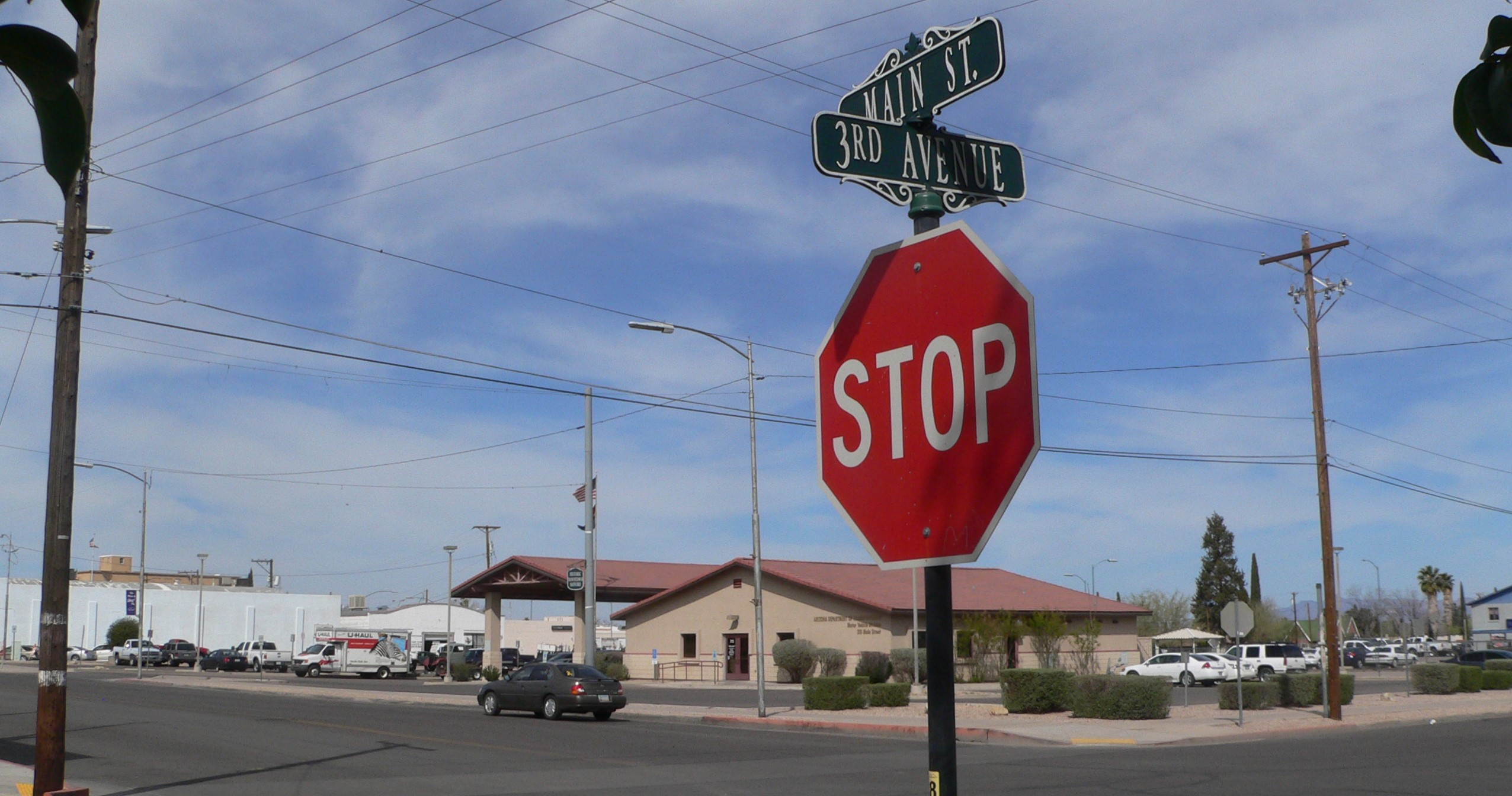
Former site of hotel (2015 photo)

Formerly located at 322 Main Street, the Buena Vista Hotel was a two-story, 80 feet (24 m) by 100 feet (30 m) steel frame and stucco structure with arched entrances, Spanish tile awnings and wrought iron balconies. Designed by Tucson's influential architect Henry O. Jaastad, the prominent hotel was considered to be one of the finest examples of Mission Revival architecture in Arizona.

The hotel can be seen briefly in the 1985 comedy, Lost in America, directed by and starring Albert Brooks.
