= Old Nogales City Hall and Fire Station =

Historic building in Santa Cruz County, Arizona, US

- U.S. National Register of Historic Places
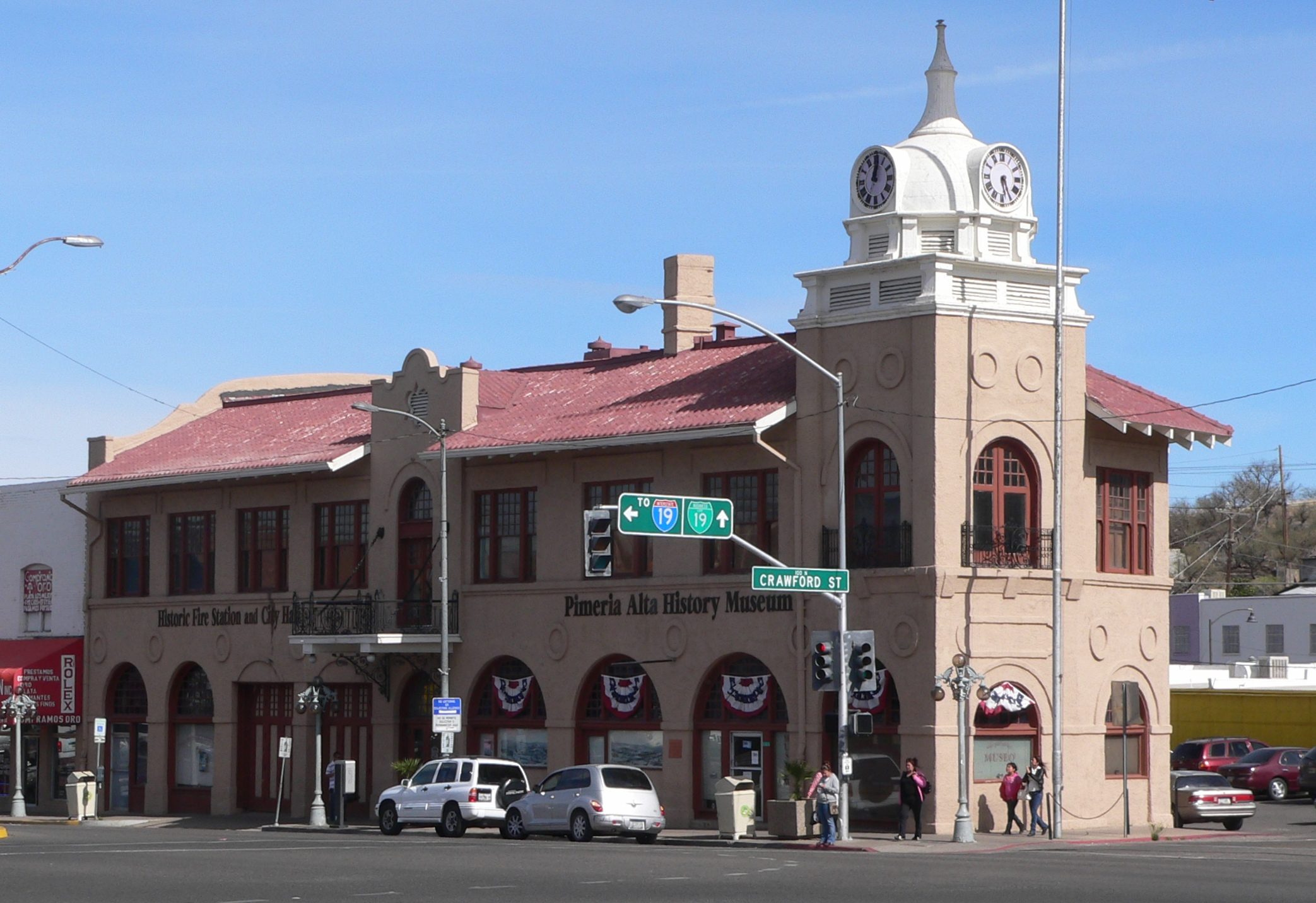

- Location within Arizona
- Location: 223 Grand Ave., Nogales, Arizona
- Coordinates: 31°20′05″N 110°56′27″W
- Area: less than one acre
- Built: 1914
- Built by: C. Burton & Son
- Architect: Henry O. Jaastad
- Architectural style: Mission/spanish Revival
- MPS: Nogales MRA (AD)
- NRHP reference No.: 80000772
- Added to NRHP: April 3, 1980

The Old Nogales City Hall and Fire Station, in Nogales, Arizona, US, was built in 1914. It was listed on the National Register of Historic Places in 1980.

It is a two-story Mission Revival-style building designed by Tucson architect Henry O. Jaastad. It has a very prominent clock tower.
