= Rueben Martinez =

Mexican-American businessman and activist

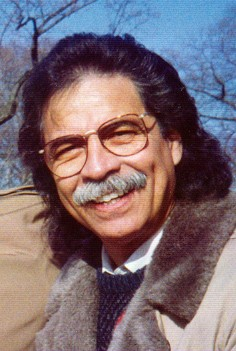
- Martinez in 1993
- Born: April 16, 1940 (age 86); Miami, Arizona
- Occupations: Barber, bookseller
- Website: www.chapman.edu/ces/libreria-martinez.aspx

Rueben Martinez (born April 26, 1940 in Miami, Arizona) is an American activist and businessman. He is active in Democratic party politics and runs a barbershop and a Latino-focused bookstore in Santa Ana, California.

== Early life ==
Seeing no future for himself in the small mining town where he grew up, at the age of seventeen Martinez left Arizona for Southern California. He found a job at the massive Bethlehem Steel plant in Maywood, East Los Angeles, attended night school at Santa Ana College, married and began raising a family. By the standards of his community he was a success, but as the years went by Martinez began to feel that he hadn't yet found an occupation which was 'the right fit.' He quit Bethlehem Steel to explore a series of other jobs in Southern California until finally in the late 1970s he used his savings to open a barbershop in downtown Santa Ana and proceeded to cut hair full-time for over twenty years.

== Professional life ==
His barber shop in downtown Santa Ana, California was a gathering place in Orange County. His interest in the community and in the needs of small businessmen led him to be active in California Democratic politics, especially among Latinos. He has been a delegate to several nominating conventions.

In 1993, Martinez got an idea that grew from a customer novelty to a national business. Martinez realized that the Latino community in California did not have bookshops that focused on their culture. His small collection of books featuring imported books and Latino and Chicano artists soon outgrew his barbershop. He moved his business around the corner to an empty storefront and turned his attention to the books.

Librería Martinez Books & Art Gallery and Libros Para Niños, a children’s bookstore, are recognized nationwide for showcasing Latino authors and artists. He seeks to make Latino books available to children, and has promoted reading among children of all ages.

== MacArthur Fellows Program ==
In 2004, Martinez was the recipient of a MacArthur Fellowship. The selection committee cited Martinez for "fusing the roles of marketplace and community center to inspire appreciation of literature and preserve Latino literary heritage."

== See also ==
- Mexican American writers
