= Our Lady of the Blessed Sacrament Church =

Historic church in Arizona, United States

- U.S. National Register of Historic Places
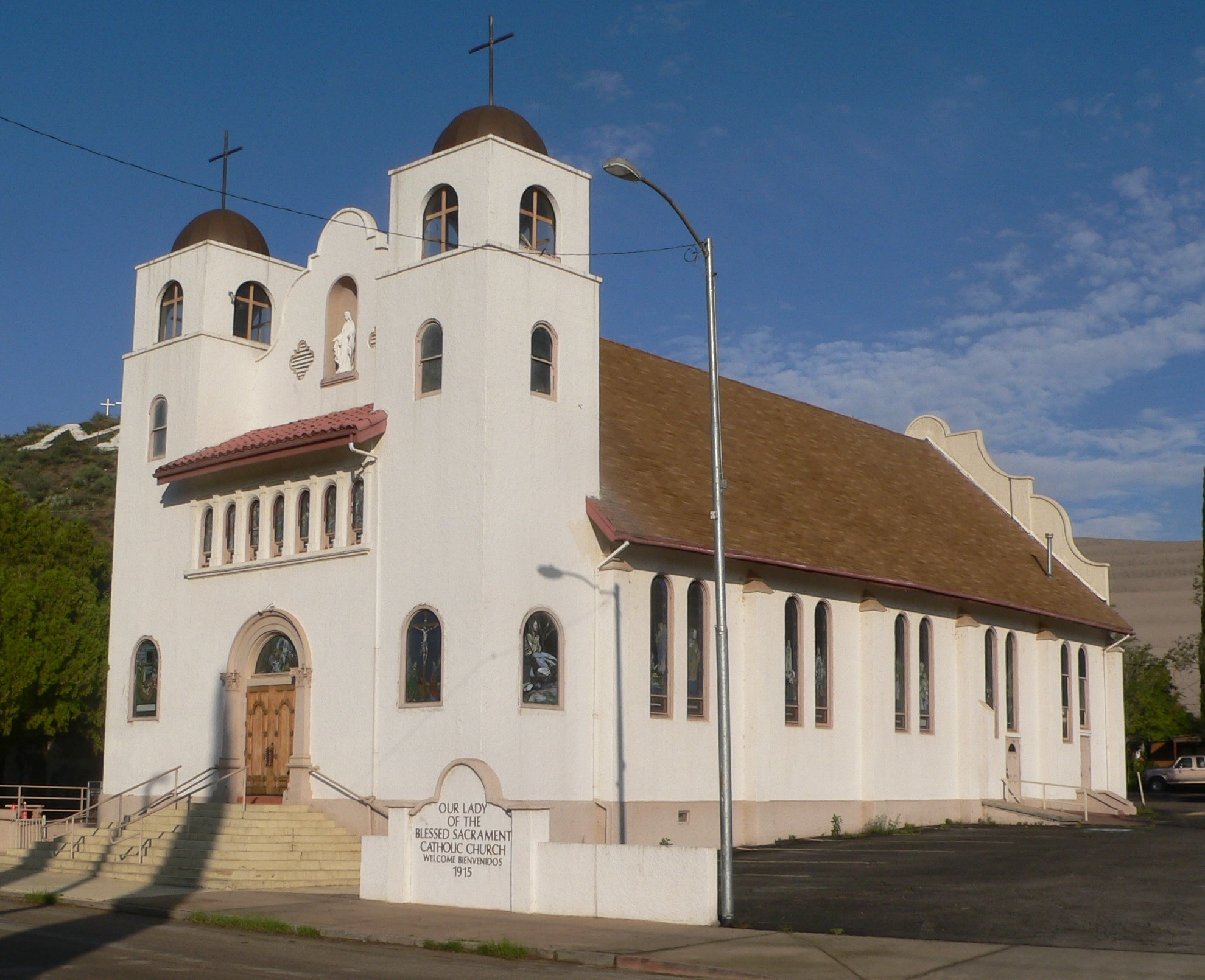

- Location within Arizona Location within the United States
- Location: 844 Sullivan St., Miami, Arizona
- Coordinates: 33°23′50″N 110°52′29″W
- Area: less than one acre
- Built: 1917
- Architect: Henry O. Jaastad
- Architectural style: Mission/spanish Revival
- NRHP reference No.: 07001332
- Added to NRHP: January 2, 2008

Our Lady of the Blessed Sacrament Church is a Roman Catholic church of the Diocese of Tucson at 844 Sullivan Street in Miami, Arizona, United States. It was built in 1917 and was added to the National Register of Historic Places in 2008.

== Gallery ==
Our Lady of the Blessed Sacrament Church
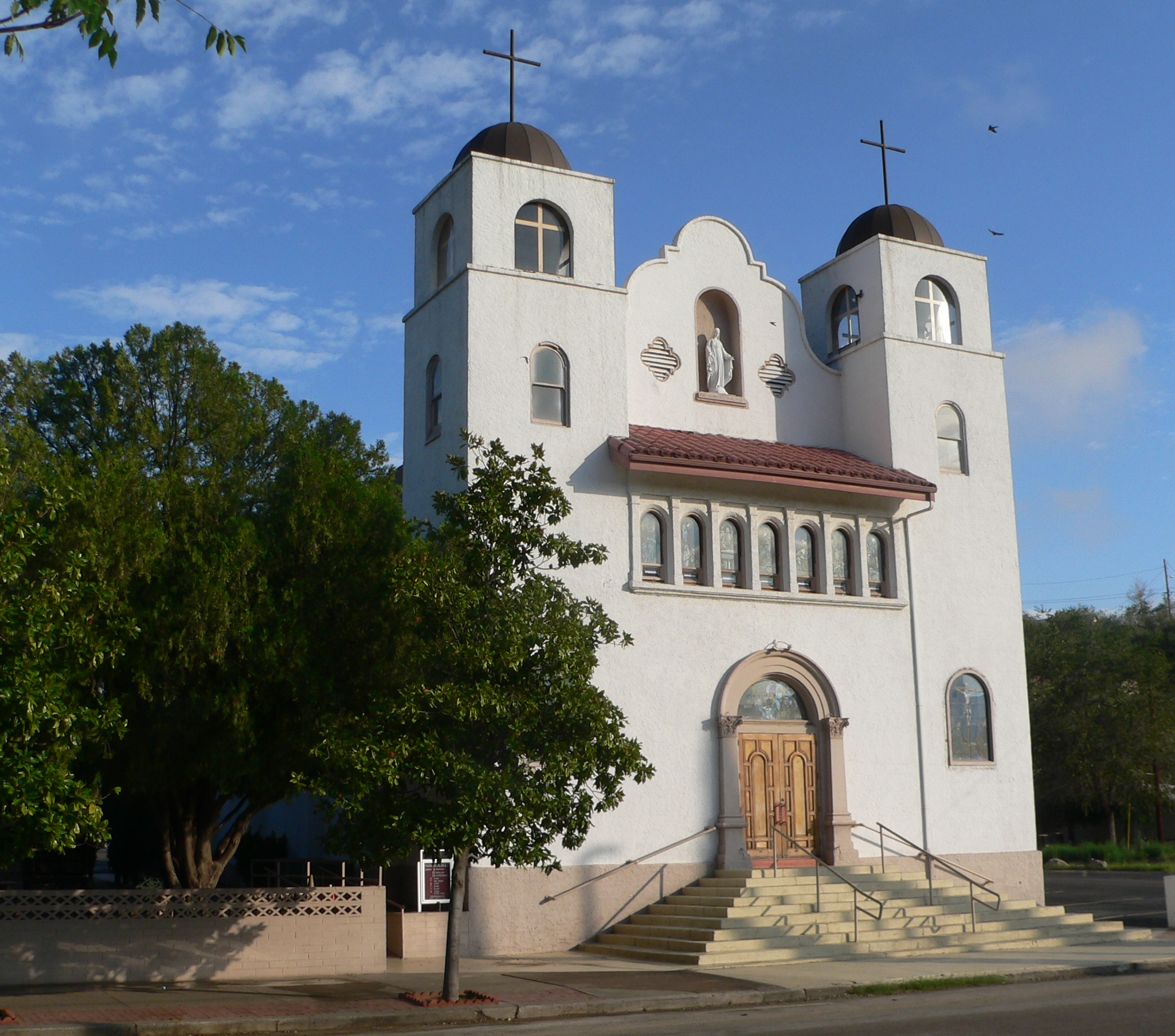
Our Lady of the Blessed Sacrament

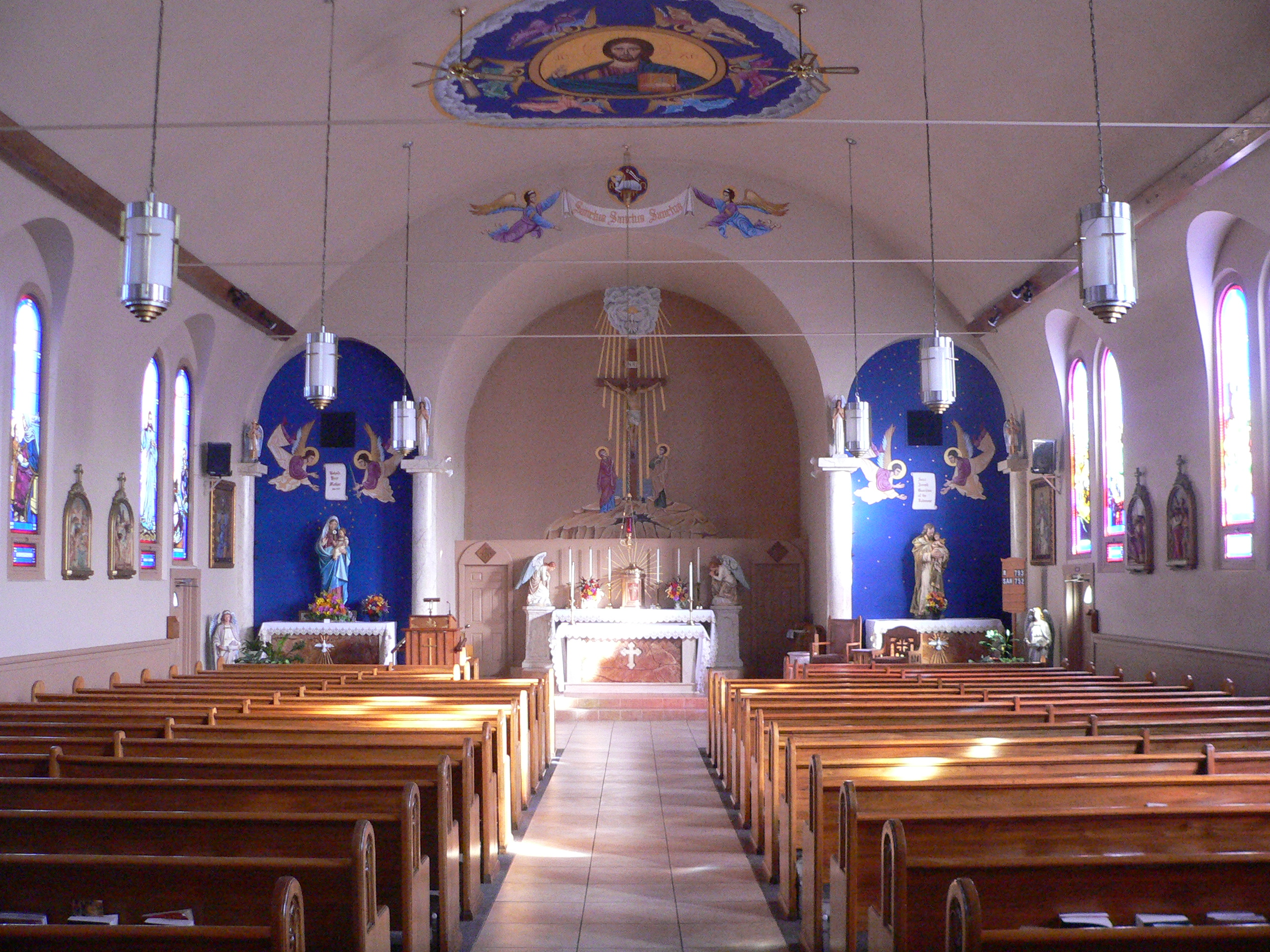
Our Lady of the Blessed Sacrament interior

== See also ==
- List of historic properties in Miami, Arizona
