= Safford High School =

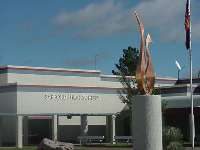

Location
- 1400 W 11th Street; Safford, Arizona 85546; United States; 32°49′43″N 109°43′37″W

Information
- Type: Public secondary
- Established: 1915 (111 years ago)
- CEEB code: 030355
- Principal: Tad Jacobson
- Teaching staff: 35.84 (FTE)
- Enrollment: 846 (2023–2024)
- Student to teacher ratio: 23.60
- Colors: Blue and white
- Mascot: Bulldogs
- Website: shs.saffordusd.com

Safford High School, of the Safford Unified School District, is one of two public high schools in Safford, Arizona. The campus hosts the Safford Center for the Arts, located on the north lot of the campus property.

== History of the SHS campus ==
Safford High School was established as an institution in 1915. Its original building opened to students on September 13, 1915, and served as the main high school building through the 1979-80 school year.

The current SHS campus was carved out of cotton fields in 1980. The superintendent at that time was Ray Evans. Donald Wilson had retired in 1978. The current campus was built in bits and pieces over the course of two and a half decades. The original plan for the high school was not completed, with some modification, until the opening of the new auditorium in 2006. When opened there was just the main classroom building and the gym. They were painted brown. In 1985, under the guidance of Superintendent Ron Starcher, the high school was repainted its current slightly cream/beige color. A teacher at the time termed the new paint job, "Very much an improvement." There was also just one paved road to the school, 11th Street. During the 1984–85 school years the roads connecting the school to Relation Street and to 20th Ave were completed. In 1986 a bond issue passed that allowed for the cafeteria, orchestra pit, and shop building that connects the gym and main building to be built. It also approved the construction of the current football stadium and track. Until that time there was no cafeteria, just a snack bar, all of the shop students still had to go over to the junior high, and all home track meets were at EAC. All of these new facilities were opened by the 1987–88 school year. It was in this year the current bus barn was added. Then in 1990 the current baseball stadium and tennis courts were developed and later softball fields were developed when that sport was added. In the late 1990s the road connecting the school to Eighth Street was completed. In 2000 the new second gym and wrestling rooms was added to the building. Then in 2006 the auditorium was finished.

== Athletics history ==
Safford High School's most successful athletics programs have been volleyball, wrestling, and track. Under Coach Norma Bellamy, the Bulldogs won 21 state volleyball championships, a national record. The last of these came in 1990. Bellamy had a record of 520-33, a national record for win percentage for coaches with over 500 wins (.940). She was named Arizona Coach of the (20th) Century in Volleyball. The boys' track team has won 16 state titles, while the girls have won 20. Herman "B.B." Andrews also won Arizona Coach of the (20th) Century for the girls' track program, with 15 titles. He also presided over a national record 13 consecutive girls' championships from 1986-1998. He has also won 10 titles with the boys', the last of which came from 2008. Safford's wrestling program has been dominant recently, winning 6 straight team state championships from 2005-2010. Baseball has won four championships, boys' basketball has won six, girls' basketball has won two, boys' golf has won three, boys' tennis has won three, and girls' tennis has won eight. Safford has won a total of 93 state championships, with 42 runner-up finishes and numerous individual champions during and outside of those reigns.

== Notable alumni ==
- Beau Allred, class of 1983, baseball player with the Cleveland Indians between 1989 and 1991
- Richard Harvey Chambers, class of 1924, chief judge of the United States Court of Appeals for the Ninth Circuit, 1959–1976
- Justin Gaethje, three-time state finalist for wrestling; professional mixed martial arts fighter, former WSOF Lightweight Champion, currently lightweight champion in UFC

== School resource officer ==
As of 2008, the school has one school resource officer assigned to it from the Safford Police Department.
