= Carol Lee MacDonald =

American politician (1934–2008)

Carol Lee MacDonald (June 5, 1934 – October 15, 2008) was a teacher, mayor, and state legislator in Arizona. She lived in Safford, Arizona, and represented Graham County, Arizona, in 1987. She was a Republican. She served as mayor of Safford, the first woman to hold the office.

She was born in Hutchinson, Kansas. She was appointed to the Safford City Council and was elected to two four-year terms. She served in the Arizona Senate beginning in 1987.

== See also ==
- Female state legislators in the United States
