= Safford City-Graham County Library =

Public library in Safford, Arizona

Safford City–Graham County Library
- 32.8313°N 109.7150°W
- Location: 808 S. 7th Avenue; Safford, Arizona, United States
- Type: Public

Other information
- Director: Victoria Silva

The Safford City–Graham County Library is a public library in Safford, Arizona serving Graham County, Greenlee County and Gila County. It is known locally by the abbreviated Safford Library.

It currently has 13,625 active users.

== Library today ==
The Safford City–Graham County Library is located on 808 S 7th Ave in Safford among a district of governmental buildings, including Safford City Hall and the Graham County Courthouse.

Jan Elliott served as its director from 2004–2012 and opened the organization to various new programs. Under Elliott's supervision, the library's primary focus was shifted to childhood literacy in 2008, partnering with programs such as Dolly Parton's Imagination Library and the online tutoring service Tutor.com.

An average of 8,000 people visit the library every month, using its computer services, books, rental movies, audiobooks and special programming. Story times for children are held weekly.

Its current building, designed in an arrowhead layout, was purchased in 1991 and converted from a furniture store. It can be seen briefly in the background in Albert Brooks' film Lost in America.

== History ==
The library was located in the Oddfellows Home of Arizona, a former sanctuary for orphans and historic attraction, from 1963–1991. The two story Tudor Revival style of building was split into two separate organizations, the bottom floor serving as the library and the top as a Safford museum.

== Funding and controversies ==
Due to the 2008 financial crisis, the Safford Library saw deep budgetary cuts in 2009. Staff and programming were reduced and an annual fee of $50.00 for non-resident users was proposed to aide funding. The communities of Graham County protested in editorials to the Eastern Arizona Courier, causing the Safford City Council to rescind the proposed charges.

In 2010 the establishment of a library district was proposed in a volunteer, community-led campaign to aide the Safford Library in its funding and prevent it from hypothetically closing. In this defense it was argued that Graham County was one of the few in the state of Arizona not to have a collectively taxed library district.
