= Inspiration, Arizona =

Abandoned town in Gila County, Arizona, US

- Populated place
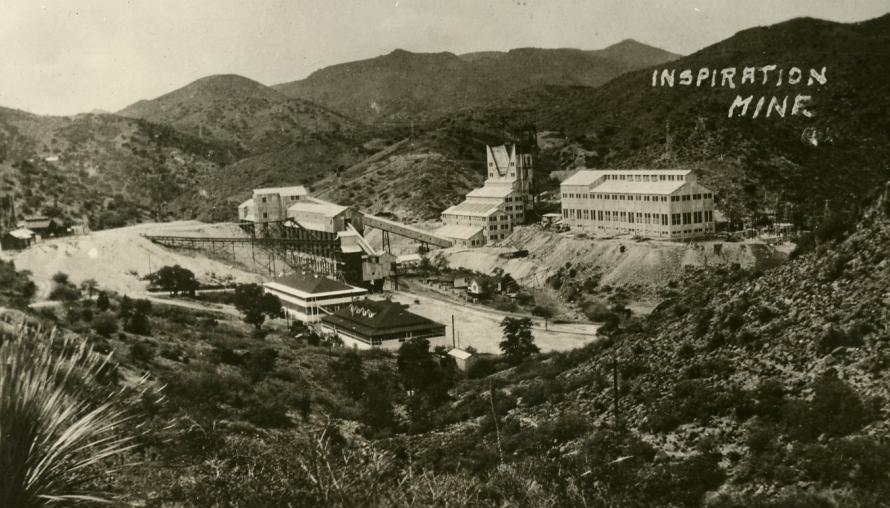
- Inspiration Mine in 1916

- Location within the state of Arizona Inspiration (the United States)
- Coordinates: 33°24′45″N 110°53′00″W
- Country: United States
- State: Arizona
- County: Gila
- Elevation: 3,927 ft (1,197 m)
- Time zone: UTC-7 (Mountain (MST))
  - Summer (DST): UTC-7 (MST)
- Area code: 928
- FIPS code: 04-35450
- GNIS feature ID: 30392

Inspiration is a ghost town in Gila County, Arizona, in the United States. It has an estimated elevation of 3,927 feet (1,197 m) above sea level. Inspiration was the company town for the Inspiration copper mine.

The old Inspiration townsite is on company property, and is not accessible to the general public.

== History ==
Inspiration had its start as a copper-mining settlement. According to tradition, the area was so named when a local prospector dreamed of finding a mine, and his dream came true. A post office called Inspiration was established in 1917, and remained in operation until it was discontinued in 1983.

At its peak population, Inspiration had between 350 and 400 people. There were 89 houses, three duplex apartment houses, the Benjamin Franklin School, the Warrior Store and service station, the Inspiration Post Office, and the telephone office. As of 2013, only the school building, the gas station, and some walls and foundations remain.

== Inspiration mine ==
The rich Inspiration copper mine opened in 1911. It was promoted by Boyce Thompson, who owned the nearby Magma Mine in Superior, Arizona. He retained a 15% interest in the Inspiration Consolidated Copper Company when that was founded in 1915. The mine is currently operated by Freeport-McMoran, which renamed it the Miami Mine.
