= Miami, Arizona =

Town in Gila County, Arizona

- Town
- Miami
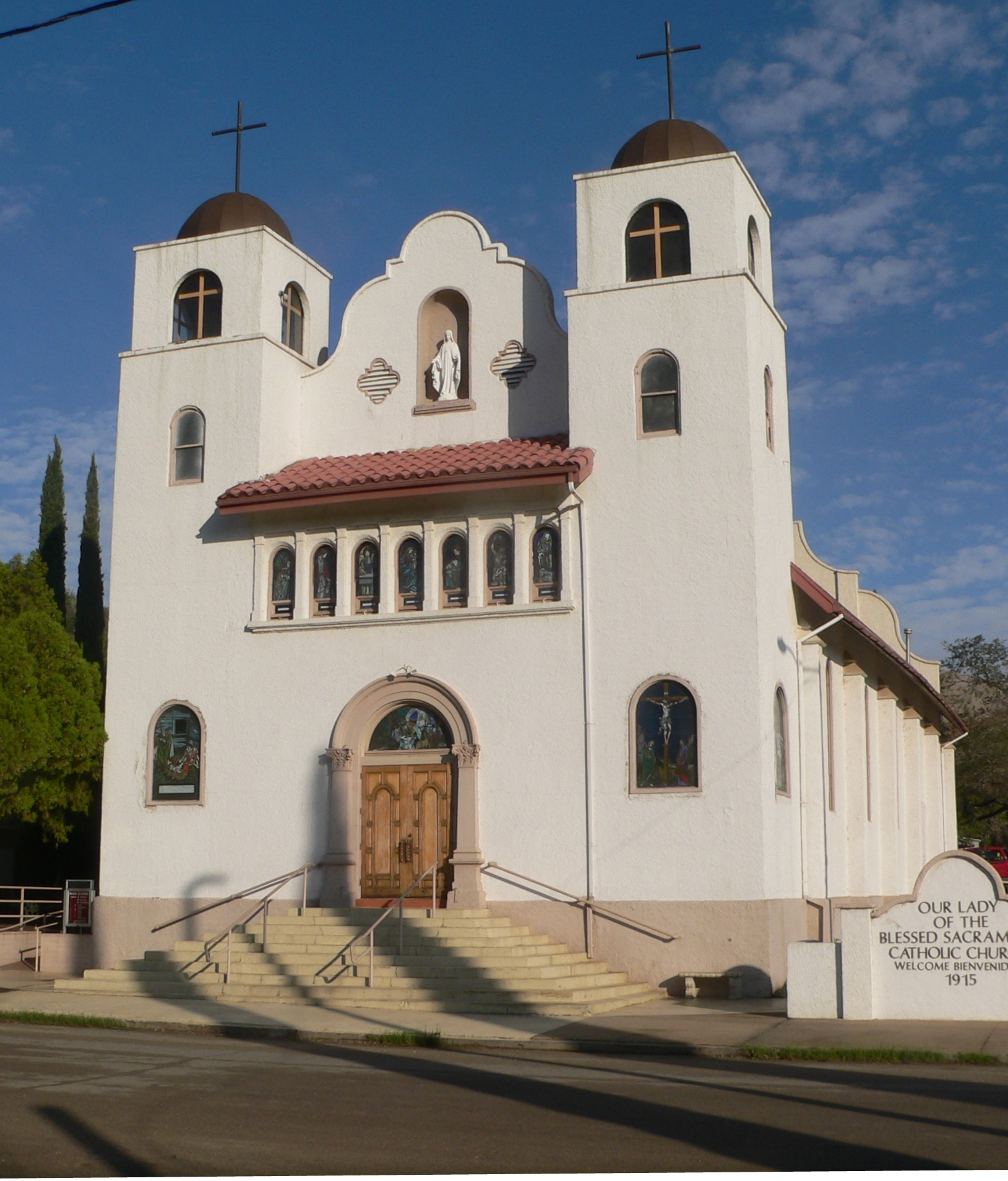

- Flag

- Location of Miami in Gila County, Arizona

- Location in the United States Miami (the United States)
- Coordinates: 33°23.8′N 110°52.3′W
- Country: United States
- State: Arizona
- County: Gila

Government
  - Mayor: Sammy Gonzales

Area
  - Total: 0.89 sq mi (2.31 km^{2})
  - Land: 0.89 sq mi (2.31 km^{2})
  - Water: 0 sq mi (0.00 km^{2})
- Elevation: 3,402 ft (1,037 m)

Population (2020)
  - Total: 1,541
  - Density: 1,729.4/sq mi (667.73/km^{2})
- Time zone: UTC-7 (MST (no DST))
- ZIP code: 85539
- Area code: 928
- FIPS code: 04-46350
- GNIS feature ID: 31789
- Website: miamiaz.gov

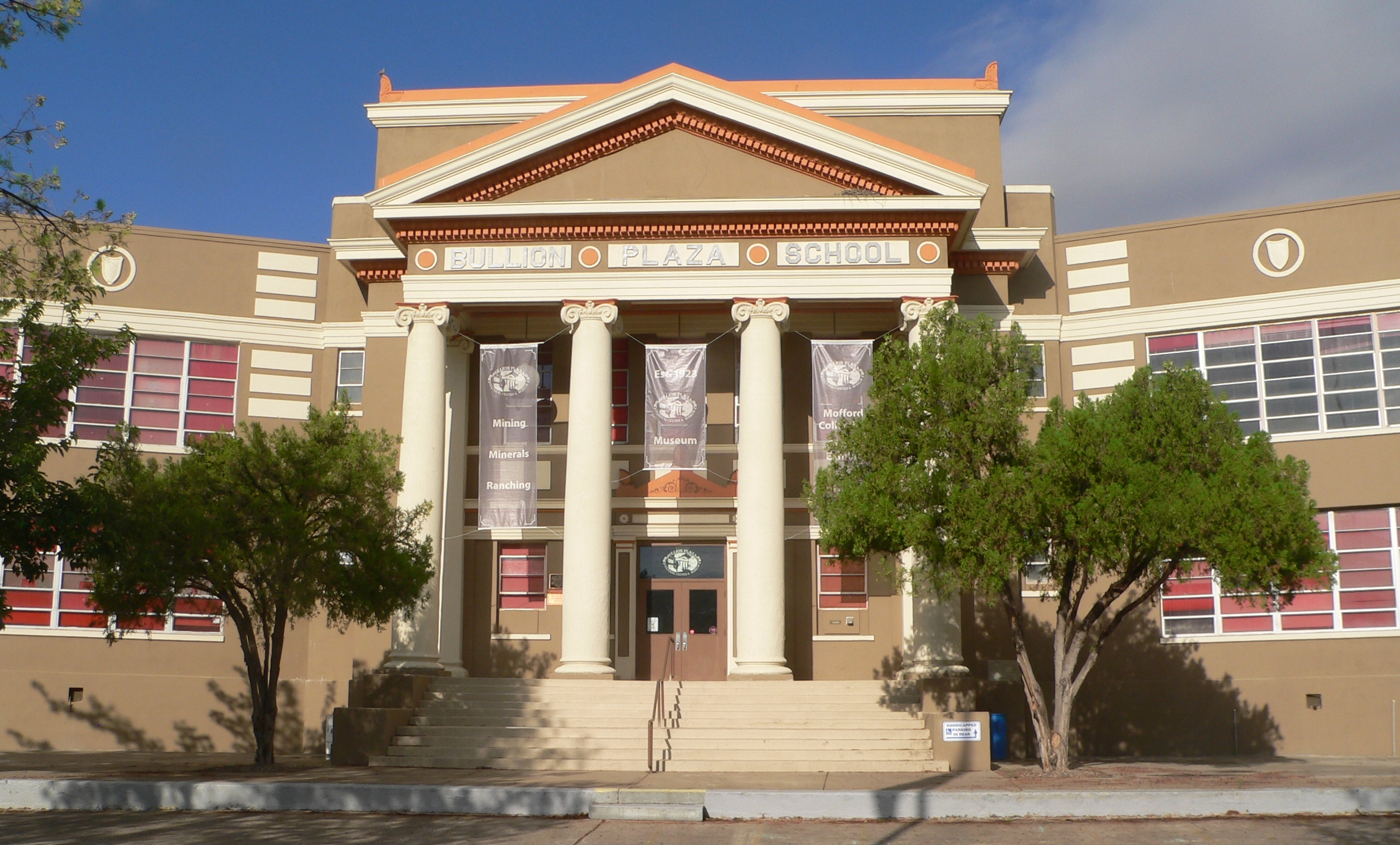
Bullion Plaza Museum, listed on the National Register of Historic Places

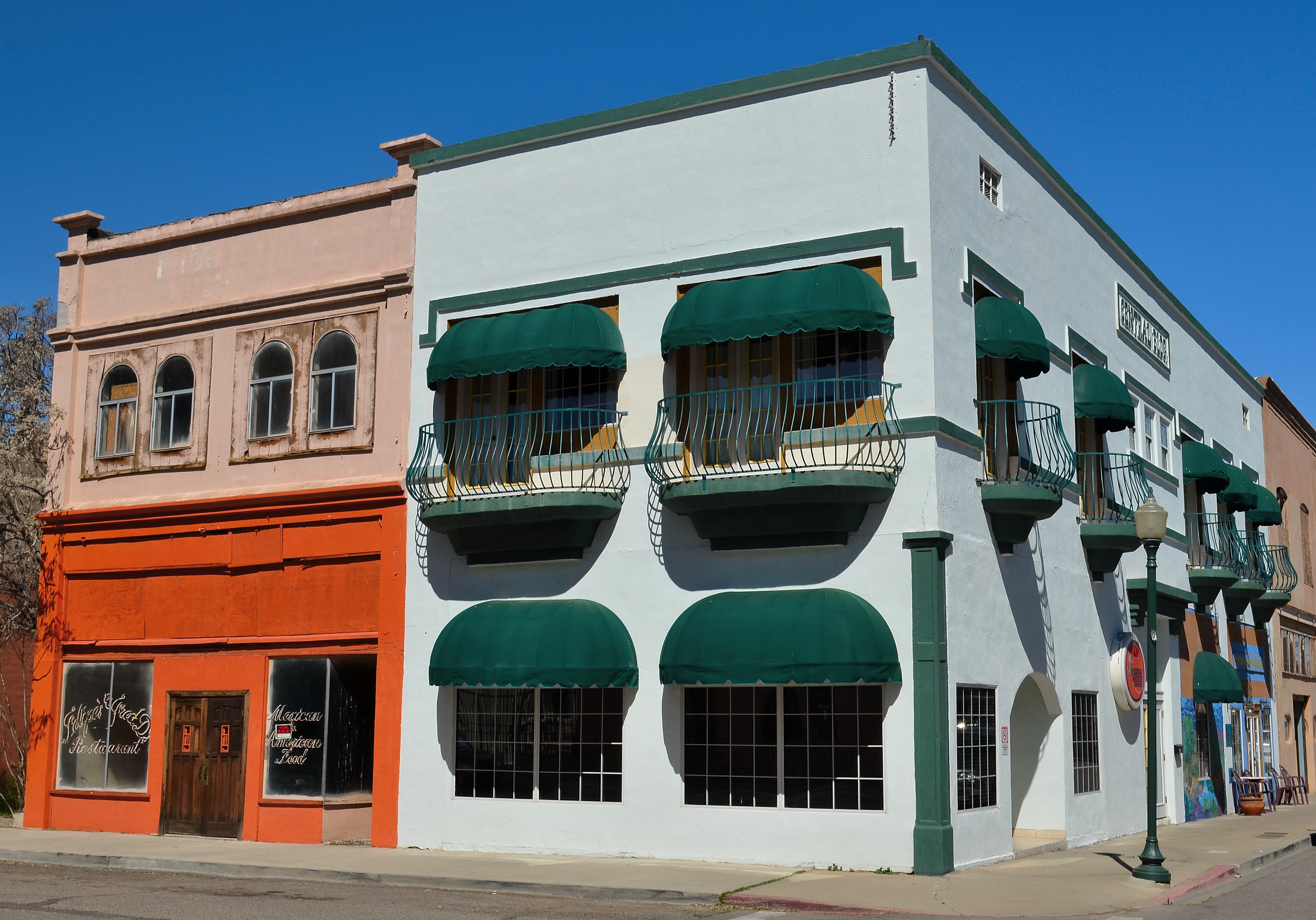
Central Building - after restoration

Miami (Western Apache: Goshtłʼish Tú) is a town in Gila County, Arizona, United States. Miami is a classic Western copper boom-town. Miami's old downtown has been partly renovated, and the Bullion Plaza Museum features the cultural, mining and ranching history of the Miami area.

As of the 2020 census, Miami had a population of 1,541.

== Geography ==
Miami is located at 33°23.8'N 110°52.3'W (33.396, -110.872).

According to the United States Census Bureau, the town has a total area of .9 square miles (2.3 km^{2}), all land.

Miami is adjacent to Globe, and near the San Carlos Apache Indian Reservation. Miami, Globe, and the unincorporated areas nearby (including Inspiration, Claypool and Central Heights-Midland City) are commonly called Globe-Miami. The town is located on the northeastern slope of the Pinal Mountains, and is surrounded (except to the east) by the Tonto National Forest. It is located on U.S. Route 60 and is served by the Arizona Eastern Railway.

== Demographics ==
Historical population
Census	Pop.	Note	%±
1910	1,390		—
1920	6,689		381.2%
1930	7,693		15.0%
1940	4,722		−38.6%
1950	4,329		−8.3%
1960	3,350		−22.6%
1970	3,394		1.3%
1980	2,716		−20.0%
1990	2,018		−25.7%
2000	1,936		−4.1%
2010	1,837		−5.1%
2020	1,541		−16.1%
U.S. Decennial Census

=== 2020 census ===
As of the 2020 census, Miami had a population of 1,541. The median age was 39.3 years. 25.6% of residents were under the age of 18 and 21.5% of residents were 65 years of age or older. For every 100 females there were 94.3 males, and for every 100 females age 18 and over there were 92.4 males age 18 and over.

98.8% of residents lived in urban areas, while 1.2% lived in rural areas.

There were 639 households in Miami, of which 31.3% had children under the age of 18 living in them. Of all households, 30.0% were married-couple households, 25.7% were households with a male householder and no spouse or partner present, and 35.8% were households with a female householder and no spouse or partner present. About 34.6% of all households were made up of individuals and 14.9% had someone living alone who was 65 years of age or older.

There were 890 housing units, of which 28.2% were vacant. The homeowner vacancy rate was 3.0% and the rental vacancy rate was 19.5%.

Racial composition as of the 2020 census
Race	Number	Percent
White	881	57.2%
Black or African American	21	1.4%
American Indian and Alaska Native	62	4.0%
Asian	6	0.4%
Native Hawaiian and Other Pacific Islander	3	0.2%
Some other race	327	21.2%
Two or more races	241	15.6%
Hispanic or Latino (of any race)	807	52.4%

=== 2000 census ===
As of the census of 2000, there were 1,936 people, 754 households, and 493 families residing in the town. The population density was 2,008.0 inhabitants per square mile (775.3/km^{2}). There were 930 housing units at an average density of 964.6 per square mile (372.4/km^{2}). The racial makeup of the town was 74.7% White, 1.0% Black or African American, 1.5% Native American, 0.1% Asian, 20.4% from other races, and 2.3% from two or more races. 54.4% of the population were Hispanic or Latino of any race.

There were 754 households, out of which 31.6% had children under the age of 18 living with them, 42.7% were married couples living together, 16.8% had a female householder with no husband present, and 34.5% were non-families. 31.0% of all households were made up of individuals, and 15.8% had someone living alone who was 65 years of age or older. The average household size was 2.57 and the average family size was 3.21.

In the town, the age distribution of the population was 29.7% under the age of 18, 8.3% from 18 to 24, 24.0% from 25 to 44, 20.9% from 45 to 64, and 17.1% who were 65 years of age or older. The median age was 36 years. For every 100 females, there were 92.1 males. For every 100 females age 18 and over, there were 93.6 males.

=== Economic profile ===
Copper mining accounts for the largest number of jobs in Miami. According to the 2002 annual report of the Arizona State Mine Inspector, Freeport-McMoRan employed nearly 600 at its Miami operations, including 330 at the smelter and 187 at the mine.

=== Income and poverty ===
The median income for a household in the town was $27,196, and the median income for a family was $30,625. Males had a median income of $28,250 versus $18,026 for females. The per capita income for the town was $13,674. About 20.5% of families and 23.6% of the population were below the poverty line, including 28.7% of those under age 18 and 19.7% of those age 65 or over.

== Mining ==
The Miami mine is owned and operated by Freeport-McMoRan. Mining began in 1911 as the Inspiration mine, and the nation's first froth flotation copper concentrator to process sulfide minerals was built and began production in 1915. Inspiration was among the first to employ vat leaching in 1926 and precipitation plants to recover oxide minerals. Copper was mined underground until after World War II, when the first open-pit mining began. The plant's smelter was modernized in 1974 to meet Clean Air Act standards and further modernized and expanded in 1992. The success of a solvent extraction and electrowinning plant commissioned in 1979 ended vat leaching by the mid-1980s, and the concentrator closed in 1986 as well. The copper rod mill was commissioned in 1966.

Copper mining was suspended in September 2015. Leaching/SX-EW operations will continue but are expected to decline over time. The Miami smelter and rod plant continue to operate. In 2016, copper production at Miami amounted to 25 million pounds of copper. In 2017, copper production was 19 million pounds, and more than 740 people were employed there.

The Pinto Valley mine is also located near Miami.

== Transportation ==
The Town of Miami operates the Copper Mountain Community Transit, which provides local bus service in Miami and Globe.

Greyhound Lines serves Miami on its Phoenix-El Paso via Globe route. The Miami stop serves Globe.

== Notable people ==
- John E. Bacon, state senator in 2nd Arizona State Legislature
- Romana Acosta Bañuelos – Treasurer of the United States under Richard Nixon
- Joe Castro – jazz pianist
- Jack Elam – actor, partly known for having lazy-eye, who was inducted into the Hall of Great Western Performers
- Brady Ellison – American archery Olympian, winner of individual bronze medal at the 2016 Olympic Games, multiple World Cup Gold medalist
- Matt Pagnozzi – Major League Baseball player for the Cleveland Indians
- Rueben Martinez – activist and MacArthur Fellow
- Felix L. Sparks – American military commander who led the first Allied force to enter Dachau concentration camp and liberate its prisoners, chronicled in the Netflix series The Liberator
- Esteban Edward Torres – ambassador and politician
- Richard F. Pedersen – United States Ambassador to Hungary, President of the American University of Cairo
- Manuel V. Mendoza – World War II Medal Of Honor Recipient, U.S. Army
- Alfredo Gutierrez – politician and Arizona State Senate majority leader
- Nancy Gonzales - first woman of color to be appointed Provost and Executive Vice President of Arizona State University

== Climate ==
Miami has a semi-arid climate (Köppen: BSh).

Climate data for Miami, Arizona, 1991–2020 normals, extremes 1914–2008
Month	Jan	Feb	Mar	Apr	May	Jun	Jul	Aug	Sep	Oct	Nov	Dec	Year
Record high °F (°C)	81 (27)	84 (29)	93 (34)	99 (37)	106 (41)	111 (44)	113 (45)	110 (43)	108 (42)	104 (40)	89 (32)	79 (26)	113 (45)
Mean daily maximum °F (°C)	62.4 (16.9)	65.0 (18.3)	71.6 (22.0)	78.4 (25.8)	87.3 (30.7)	97.2 (36.2)	99.5 (37.5)	98.3 (36.8)	94.2 (34.6)	84.0 (28.9)	71.9 (22.2)	61.1 (16.2)	80.9 (27.2)
Daily mean °F (°C)	49.3 (9.6)	51.8 (11.0)	57.2 (14.0)	63.6 (17.6)	72.7 (22.6)	82.4 (28.0)	85.8 (29.9)	84.6 (29.2)	79.9 (26.6)	69.3 (20.7)	57.6 (14.2)	48.1 (8.9)	66.9 (19.4)
Mean daily minimum °F (°C)	36.3 (2.4)	38.5 (3.6)	42.7 (5.9)	48.7 (9.3)	58.1 (14.5)	67.7 (19.8)	72.1 (22.3)	70.9 (21.6)	65.5 (18.6)	54.5 (12.5)	43.3 (6.3)	35.2 (1.8)	52.8 (11.6)
Record low °F (°C)	8 (−13)	14 (−10)	19 (−7)	29 (−2)	32 (0)	46 (8)	54 (12)	56 (13)	43 (6)	26 (−3)	20 (−7)	14 (−10)	8 (−13)
Average precipitation inches (mm)	2.29 (58)	2.19 (56)	1.68 (43)	0.44 (11)	0.30 (7.6)	0.27 (6.9)	2.24 (57)	2.56 (65)	1.14 (29)	0.99 (25)	1.18 (30)	1.94 (49)	17.22 (437.5)
Average precipitation days (≥ 0.01 in)	4.9	4.7	4.3	2.6	1.7	1.5	7.3	8.7	4.3	3.5	2.7	4.5	50.7
Source 1: NOAA
Source 2: XMACIS2

== Gallery ==
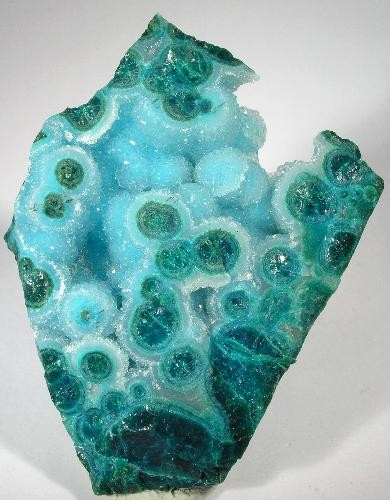
Chrysocolla and quartz specimen from the Live Oak mine above Miami. Live Oak is famous among mineral collectors for this mineral combination.

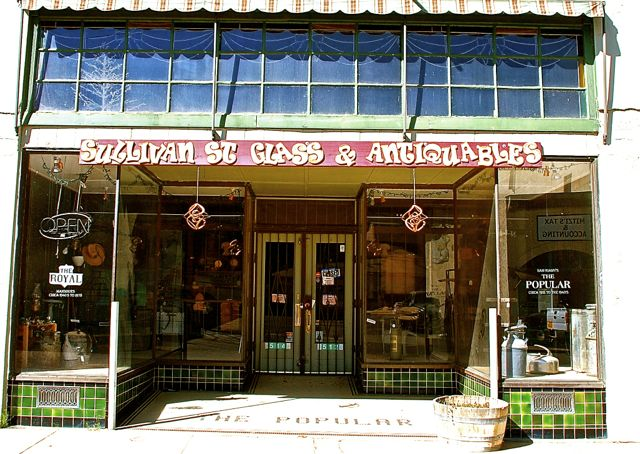
One of many antique shops located in downtown Miami

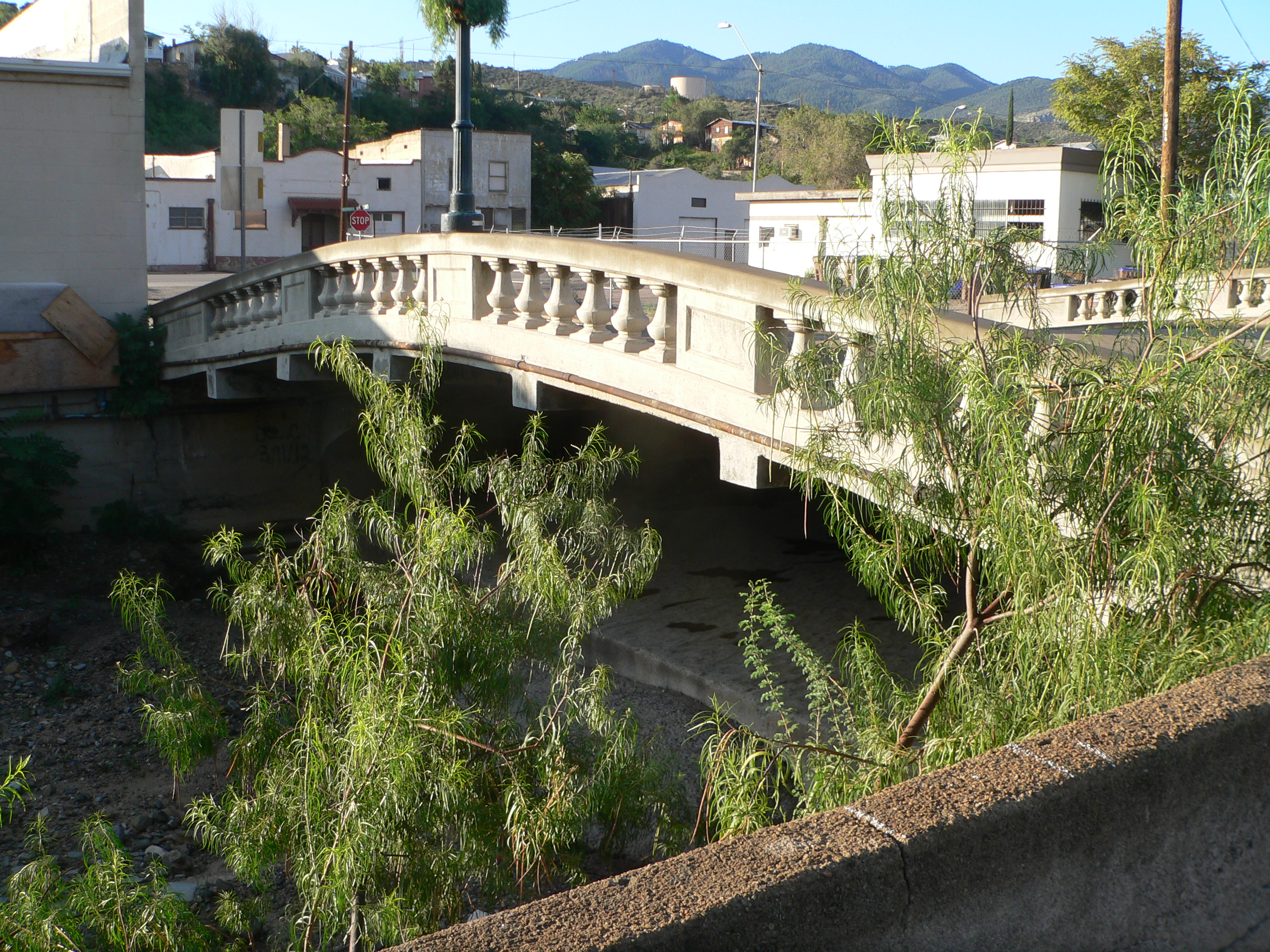
One of five Luten arch bridges spanning Bloody Tanks Wash in downtown Miami

== See also ==
- List of historic properties in Miami, Arizona
- National Register of Historic Places listings in Gila County, Arizona; eight properties listed in Miami, including:

- Our Lady of the Blessed Sacrament Church
- Miami Community Church
