= Copper Bell Bed and Breakfast =

- U.S. National Register of Historic Places
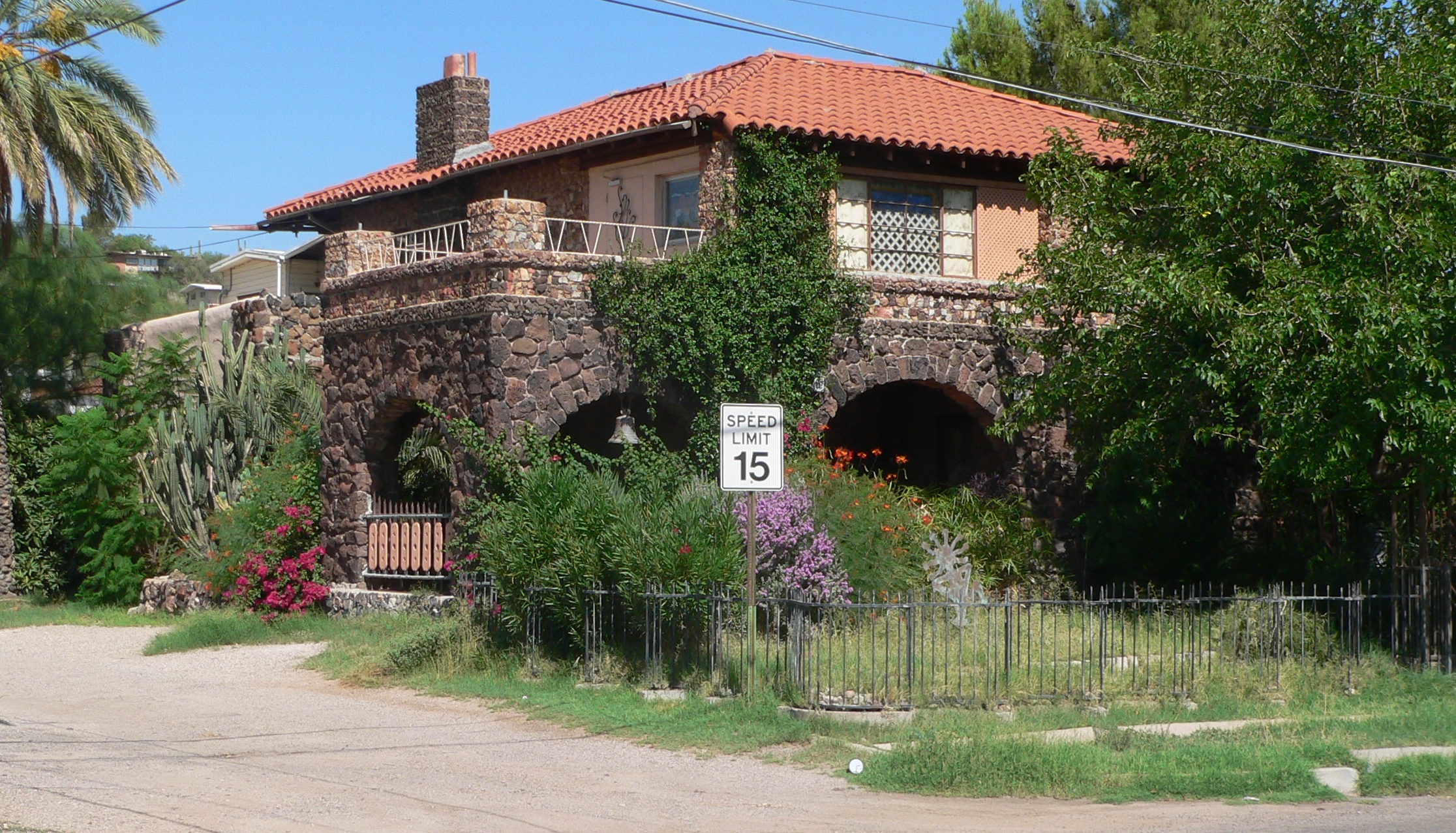
- House at 25 N. Westmoreland Avenue, seen from the southeast.

- Location within Arizona Location within the United States
- Location: 25 N. Westmoreland Ave., Tucson, Arizona
- Coordinates: 32°13′13.3″N 110°59′33.7″W
- Built: 1910; 116 years ago
- Architect: Jaastad, Henrik Olsen; Boudreaux, Leon, John G Henderson,
- Architectural style: Bungalow/Craftsman, Craftsman eclectic
- MPS: Menlo Park MPS
- NRHP reference No.: 92000254
- Added to NRHP: March 30, 1992

Copper Bell Bed and Breakfast, also known as Las Piedras Rest Home, is located in Tucson, Arizona, United States. It was built in 1910 and was listed on the National Register of Historic Places in 1992.

It was a sanatarium.

It is operated as a Bed and Breakfast inn. "Circa 1907. Uniquely constructed of lava stone, this home includes an old copper bell brought from a German church."
