= Arizona Hotel (Tucson, Arizona) =

- U.S. National Register of Historic Places
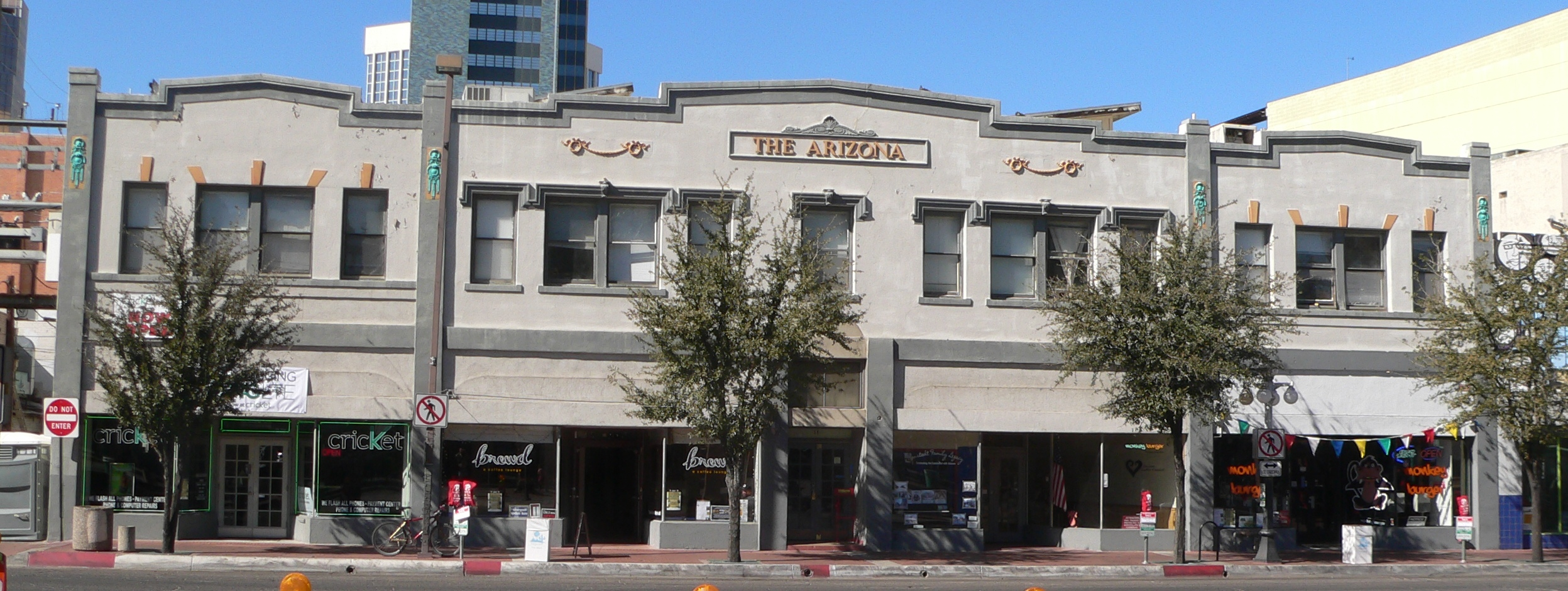
- The Arizona Hotel in 2012

- Location within Arizona
- Location: 31-47 North Sixth Avenue, 135 E. Tenth St., Tucson, Arizona
- Coordinates: 32°13′27″N 110°58′07″W
- Area: less than one acre
- Built: 1917
- Architect: Henry O. Jaastad
- Architectural style: Classical Revival
- MPS: Downtown Tucson, Arizona MPS
- NRHP reference No.: 03000902
- Added to NRHP: September 12, 2003

The Arizona Hotel is a historic two-story building in Tucson, Arizona. It was built in 1917 for Luke G. Radulovich, an investor. Wells Fargo used to have a branch on the first floor. In the 1970s, the hotel was frequented by prostitutes.

The facade was designed by architect Henry O. Jaastad in the Classical Revival style in 1918, and he redesigned it in 1933. The building has been listed on the National Register of Historic Places since September 12, 2003.
