= Safford Unified School District =

Public school district in Safford, Arizona, United States

Address
- 734 11th Street Safford, Arizona, 85546; United States
- Coordinates: 32°49′24″N 109°42′53″W

District information
- Type: Public
- Grades: K–12
- Superintendent: Ken VanWinkle
- NCES District ID: 0407240

Students and staff
- Students: 2,794 (2020–2021)
- Student–teacher ratio: 19.58

Other information
- Website: www.saffordusd.com

The Safford Unified School District is the school district that serves the City of Safford, Arizona and some minor outlying areas.

== Headquarters ==
The SUSD Headquarters (District office) is located adjacent to the Safford Middle School campus.

== Transportation ==
SUSD Transportation (often called the Bus Barn) is responsible for the transportation of all district students. The SUSD Transportation division's main facility is located across from Safford High School.

== Facilities ==
The Safford Unified School District operates and maintains six schools.

=== Elementary (grades K–6) ===
- Lafe Nelson Elementary School (LNS)
- Ruth Powell Elementary School (RPS)
- Dorothy Stinson Elementary School (DSS)

=== Middle schools (Grades 7–8) ===
- Safford Middle School (SMS)

=== High schools (grades 9–12) ===
- Safford High School (SHS)
- Mount Graham High School (MGHS)

=== Other facilities ===
- Safford Center for the Arts (CFA)
- SUSD District Office (RAC)

== Mascot ==
The mascot for all Safford schools (with the exception being Mount Graham High School) is the Bulldog.

== Legal cases ==
Safford Unified School District v. Redding, a case involving the strip search of Savana Redding, a 13-year-old student of Safford Middle School, reached the U.S. Supreme Court in 2009. She was suspected of distributing prescription-strength ibuprofen pills due to the accusation of another student found with pills, although no pills were found. The Supreme Court found that the search violated the Fourth Amendment, but qualified immunity foreclosed the suit against the individual defendants; the Court remanded the decision as to Safford's liability to the lower courts.
