= Safford, Arizona =

City in Arizona, United States

Safford
- City
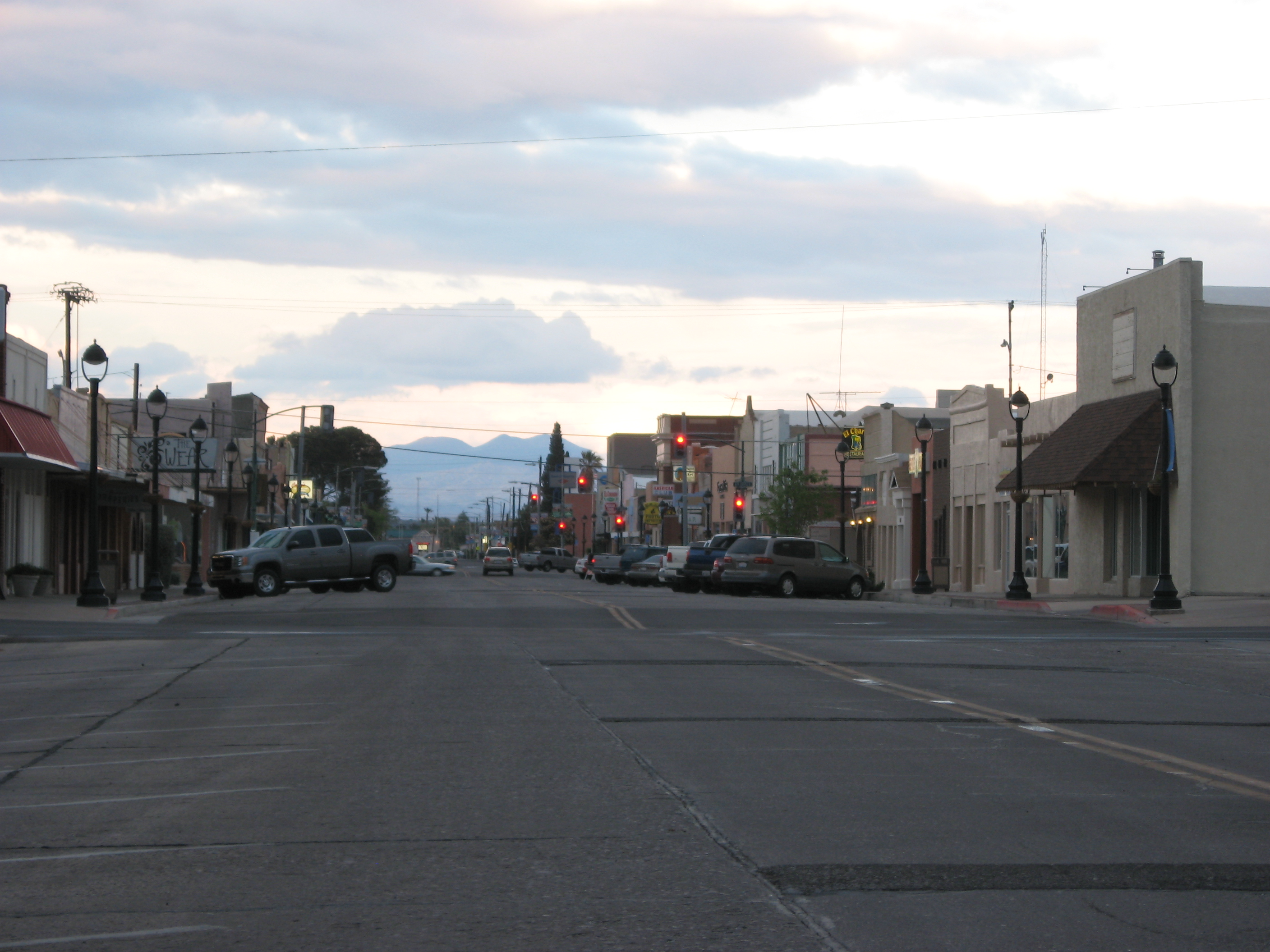

- Flag Logo

- Location of Safford in Graham County, Arizona

- Location in the United States Safford (Arizona)
- Coordinates: 32°50′12″N 109°41′50″W
- Country: United States
- State: Arizona
- County: Graham

Government
  - Mayor: Richard Ortega

Area
  - Total: 9.29 sq mi (24.07 km^{2})
  - Land: 9.27 sq mi (24.00 km^{2})
  - Water: 0.027 sq mi (0.07 km^{2})
- Elevation: 2,920 ft (890 m)

Population (2020)
  - Total: 10,129
  - Density: 1,093.1/sq mi (422.03/km^{2})
- Time zone: UTC-07:00 (MST)
- ZIP codes: 85546, 85548
- Area code: 928
- FIPS code: 04-62000
- GNIS feature ID: 2411753
- Website: City of Safford

Safford (Western Apache: Ichʼįʼ Nahiłtį́į́) is a city in Graham County, Arizona, United States. According to the 2020 Census, the population of the city is 10,129. The city is the county seat of Graham County.

Safford is the principal city of the Safford Micropolitan Statistical Area, which includes all of Graham County.

== History ==
Safford was founded by Joshua Eaton Bailey, Hiram Kennedy, and Edward Tuttle, who came from Gila Bend, in southwestern Arizona. They left Gila Bend in the winter of 1873-74 because their work on canals and dams had been destroyed by high water the previous summer. Upon arrival early in 1874, the villagers laid out the town site, including a few crude buildings.

The Town of Safford was incorporated October 10, 1901, and changed to City of Safford in 1955.

The town is named after Arizona Territorial Governor Anson P. K. Safford.

== Geography ==
The Pinaleño Mountains sit prominently to the southwest of town. The Pinaleños have the greatest vertical relief of any mountain range in Arizona.

According to the United States Census Bureau, the city has a total area of 8.6 square miles (22 km^{2}), of which 8.6 square miles (22 km^{2}) is land and 0.03 square miles (0.078 km^{2}) (0.18%) is water.

== Demographics ==
Historical population
Census	Pop.	Note	%±
1880	173		—
1910	929		—
1920	1,336		43.8%
1930	1,706		27.7%
1940	2,266		32.8%
1950	3,756		65.8%
1960	4,648		23.7%
1970	5,493		18.2%
1980	7,010		27.6%
1990	7,359		5.0%
2000	9,232		25.5%
2010	9,566		3.6%
2020	10,129		5.9%
U.S. Decennial Census

=== Racial and ethnic composition ===
Racial Makeup
Race (NH = Non-Hispanic)	% 2020	% 2010	% 2000	Pop. 2020	Pop. 2010	Pop. 2000
White Alone (NH)	51.1%	51.8%	56.2%	5,178	4,958	5,190
Black Alone (NH)	0.9%	1.1%	1.3%	88	104	118
American Indian Alone (NH)	1.6%	1%	0.7%	158	92	65
Asian Alone (NH)	0.7%	0.9%	0.9%	67	85	85
Pacific Islander Alone (NH)	0.1%	0.1%	0%	8	5	1
Other Race Alone (NH)	0.2%	0.2%	0.1%	22	15	9
Multiracial (NH)	2.6%	1.5%	1.1%	265	141	97
Hispanic (Any race)	42.9%	43.6%	39.7%	4,343	4,166	3,667

=== 2020 census ===
As of the 2020 census, Safford had a population of 10,129 and a population density of 1,093.02 inhabitants per square mile (422.02/km^{2}). The median age was 33.6 years. 27.7% of residents were under the age of 18 and 16.7% of residents were 65 years of age or older. For every 100 females there were 93.6 males, and for every 100 females age 18 and over there were 89.8 males age 18 and over.

98.6% of residents lived in urban areas, while 1.4% lived in rural areas.

There were 3,777 households in Safford, of which 37.4% had children under the age of 18 living in them. Of all households, 43.3% were married-couple households, 18.9% were households with a male householder and no spouse or partner present, and 29.6% were households with a female householder and no spouse or partner present. About 27.5% of all households were made up of individuals and 12.8% had someone living alone who was 65 years of age or older.

There were 4,230 housing units, of which 10.7% were vacant. The homeowner vacancy rate was 2.7% and the rental vacancy rate was 10.1%.

Of the population, 0.5% identified as three or more races and 0.05% as four or five races.

=== 2019 American Community Survey estimates ===
84.3% of households speak English alone while 15.4% primarily speak Spanish and 0.3% speak another language.

For those aged 18–24 years, 20.6% have completed less than high school, 29.5% have completed high school or equivalency, 42.5% have some college or an associates degree, and 7.5% hold a bachelors degree. For those aged 25 and over, 3.3% completed less than 9th grade, 9.3% completed 9-12th grade with no diploma, 22.5% completed high school, 38.7% have completed some college, 9.2% hold an associates degree, 12.4% hold a bachelors degree, and 4.6% hold a graduate or professional degree. 15.5% of males aged 25 and over hold some kind of college degree while 27.6% of females 25 and over hold a college degree.

Of the population aged 16 or over, 61.7% are in the labor force and 5.9% of the 18 and over population are veterans. The average household income was $57,904 while the median household income was $50,255. 27.7% of those under 18, 17.9% of those aged 18–64, and 16.9% of those aged 65 and over live beneath the poverty line. In 2017, the poverty line for a single person in the United States was an income of less than $12,060 per year

== Climate ==
The climate is hot semi-arid (Köppen: BSh), softened by the plateau rise (it receives enough rainfall not to fall into the hot desert category, BWh). It is much hotter than most places in eastern Arizona due to its relatively low elevation of 2,953 feet (900 m) at the Agricultural Center where records are kept, and often reaches temperatures almost as hot as found in Phoenix. In January, the average high temperature is 60 °F or 15.6 °C with a low of 29 °F or −1.7 °C. In July, the average high temperature is 98 °F or 36.7 °C with a low of 68 °F or 20 °C. Annual precipitation averages around 9.8 inches (248.9 mm), and snowfall is exceptionally rare: the mean is around 0.8 inches (0.020 m) but the median is zero.

Climate data for Safford, Arizona, 1991–2020 normals, extremes 1948–present
Month	Jan	Feb	Mar	Apr	May	Jun	Jul	Aug	Sep	Oct	Nov	Dec	Year
Record high °F (°C)	79 (26)	87 (31)	92 (33)	100 (38)	108 (42)	114 (46)	113 (45)	109 (43)	107 (42)	100 (38)	91 (33)	79 (26)	114 (46)
Mean maximum °F (°C)	71.7 (22.1)	77.6 (25.3)	85.4 (29.7)	93.5 (34.2)	101.5 (38.6)	107.0 (41.7)	106.8 (41.6)	104.3 (40.2)	100.6 (38.1)	95.1 (35.1)	83.1 (28.4)	72.5 (22.5)	108.5 (42.5)
Mean daily maximum °F (°C)	62.0 (16.7)	66.8 (19.3)	74.3 (23.5)	82.5 (28.1)	91.4 (33.0)	100.0 (37.8)	99.0 (37.2)	96.9 (36.1)	93.2 (34.0)	84.4 (29.1)	71.7 (22.1)	61.1 (16.2)	81.9 (27.8)
Daily mean °F (°C)	46.2 (7.9)	50.4 (10.2)	56.8 (13.8)	64.0 (17.8)	72.5 (22.5)	81.3 (27.4)	84.2 (29.0)	82.4 (28.0)	77.1 (25.1)	66.3 (19.1)	54.6 (12.6)	45.7 (7.6)	65.1 (18.4)
Mean daily minimum °F (°C)	30.3 (−0.9)	33.9 (1.1)	39.3 (4.1)	45.5 (7.5)	53.6 (12.0)	62.6 (17.0)	69.4 (20.8)	68.0 (20.0)	61.0 (16.1)	48.3 (9.1)	37.4 (3.0)	30.2 (−1.0)	48.3 (9.1)
Mean minimum °F (°C)	19.7 (−6.8)	22.7 (−5.2)	27.1 (−2.7)	33.2 (0.7)	41.2 (5.1)	51.8 (11.0)	60.9 (16.1)	59.9 (15.5)	49.7 (9.8)	34.5 (1.4)	23.8 (−4.6)	19.0 (−7.2)	16.5 (−8.6)
Record low °F (°C)	9 (−13)	5 (−15)	16 (−9)	26 (−3)	28 (−2)	39 (4)	48 (9)	47 (8)	37 (3)	23 (−5)	14 (−10)	7 (−14)	5 (−15)
Average precipitation inches (mm)	0.71 (18)	0.66 (17)	0.45 (11)	0.21 (5.3)	0.18 (4.6)	0.27 (6.9)	1.35 (34)	1.84 (47)	1.08 (27)	0.75 (19)	0.51 (13)	0.77 (20)	8.78 (222.8)
Average snowfall inches (cm)	0.2 (0.51)	0.0 (0.0)	0.0 (0.0)	0.0 (0.0)	0.0 (0.0)	0.0 (0.0)	0.0 (0.0)	0.0 (0.0)	0.0 (0.0)	0.0 (0.0)	0.0 (0.0)	0.0 (0.0)	0.2 (0.51)
Average precipitation days (≥ 0.01 in)	4.6	4.4	3.3	1.5	1.7	1.7	7.8	7.9	4.2	3.7	3.4	4.8	49.0
Average snowy days (≥ 0.1 in)	0.1	0.0	0.0	0.0	0.0	0.0	0.0	0.0	0.0	0.0	0.0	0.0	0.1
Source 1: NOAA
Source 2: National Weather Service

== Economy ==
The city's largest employers are Freeport-McMoRan Copper and Gold, Safford Unified Schools, DRG Technologies Inc, Bowman Consulting Group, Open Loop Energy and Walmart. Recently, Freeport-McMoRan opened two mining facilities just north of the city that make up the largest new mining operation in North America. Arizona State Prison Complex - Safford also employs many residents, as does the Federal Correctional Institution, Safford. Agriculture is considered to be a major economic activity, with cotton fields and a gin located in the city. A billboard along US Highway 70 announces "Safford .... Copper, Cattle & Cotton".

== Transportation ==
The community is served by a freight rail line, the Arizona Eastern Railway, and hosts an air facility, Safford Regional Airport. Additionally the Arizona Department of Transportation is upgrading U.S. Route 191 from Interstate 10 into a full four-lane highway. ADOT is considering putting a U.S. Route 70 loop south of the city that would run from Swift Trail Junction to Thatcher.

San Carlos Apache Nnee Bich'o Nii Transit provides transportation from Safford to the San Carlos Apache Indian Reservation and Globe. Greyhound Lines serves Safford on its Phoenix-El Paso via Globe route with a stop in Thatcher.

On January 6, 2025, Grand Canyon Scenic Airlines began twice daily flights between Safford Regional and Phoenix Sky Harbor airports. This was the first commercial service at Safford airport since 1974. These flights were suspended in September 2025 due to the depletion of the local funding that supported this route.

== Education ==
The Safford Unified School District serves the entire city of Safford and some minor outlying areas. The nearby Eastern Arizona College provides higher education services, and a University of Arizona agricultural extension is located to the east of the city.

Legislation has been suggested in state committee to transform the nearby Eastern Arizona College from its present status as a two-year community college into a full four-year educational institution.

Safford is also home to the Eastern Arizona College's Discovery Park Campus, a public educational destination facility that provides tours of the telescopes at the Mt. Graham International Observatory, a public access observatory with a research grade 20" Cassagrain telescope, the World's largest permanent mount "Camera Obscura", a full motion Shuttle simulator that takes you on a ride through the Milky Way galaxy, and galleries of historical artifacts from Graham County and the "History of Astronomy" Gallery, as well as a restored Sonoran riparian area featuring a one-acre ecology education pond and over four miles of trials that take you through the habitat of native and migratory birds, reptiles, and mammals.

The Safford City-Graham County Library provides citizens of Safford with books, computers, free classes, childhood literacy programs and entertainment. It serves 13,625 total citizens between Graham, Greenlee and Gila counties.

== Public safety ==
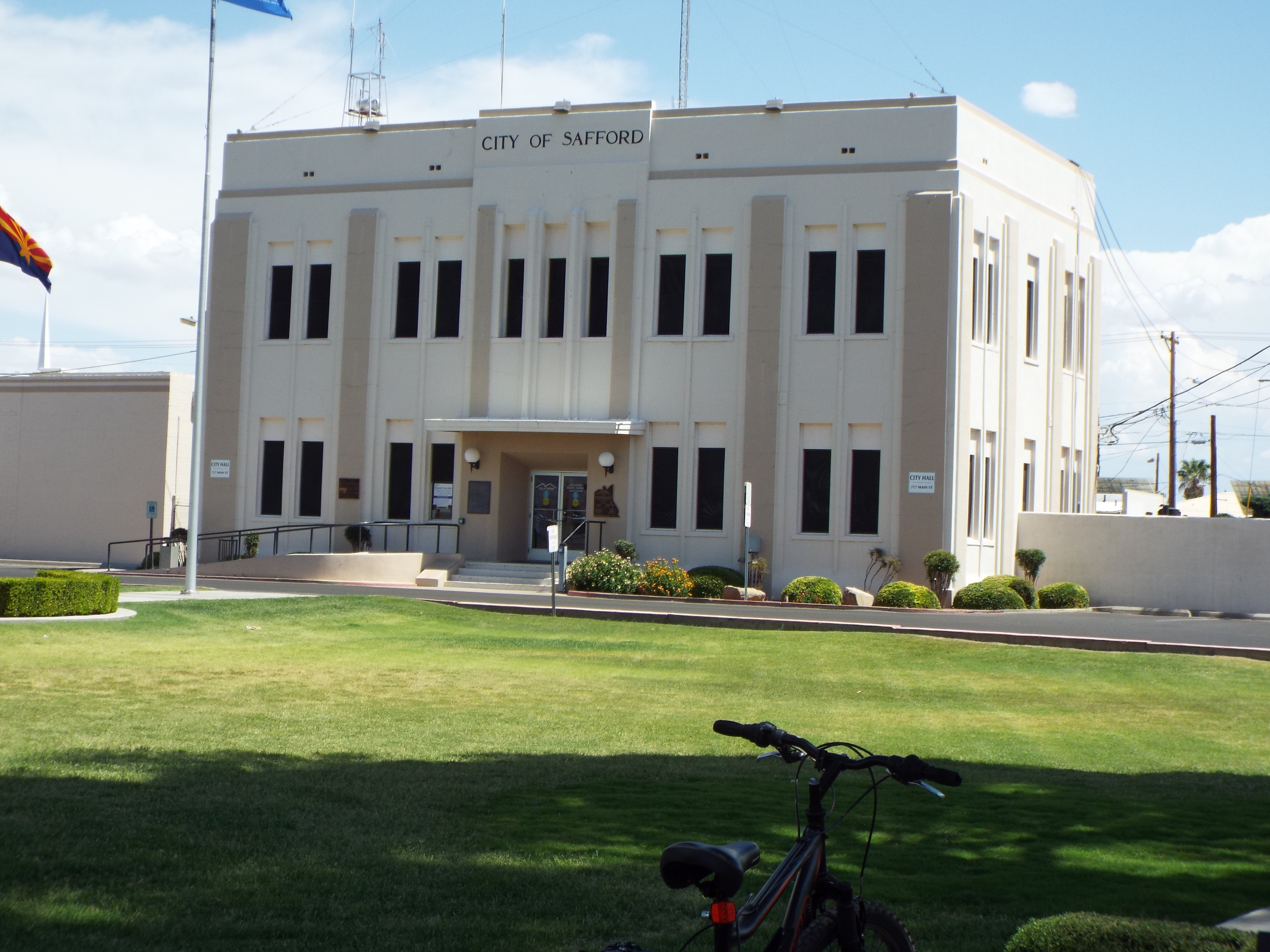
Safford City Hall

The city of Safford is served by the Safford Police Department, headed by Chief Glen Orr. Additional law enforcement services are provided by the Graham County Sheriff's Office.

Fire protection is provided by the Safford Volunteer Fire Department. The department was organized May 20, 1907, with a Fire Chief and 12 other town volunteers. Today, Safford's volunteer Fire Department consists of a Fire Chief and 31 other volunteer firefighters. The department responds to more than 200 calls per year. The department services the city's 5 square miles (13 km^{2}) as well as encompassing an area of 110 square miles (280 km^{2}) outside the city. In addition, Stafford has a nearby prison complex belonging to the Arizona State Prison Network. This prison is known as Fort Grant. Which is a 30-50 minute drive along the SR 266.

== Observatories ==
Due to Safford's relatively isolated dark sky location, the area has been chosen as a prime spot for hosting observatories. Safford and Thatcher's street lights are low-output to improve the quality of the images taken by the observatories atop the mountain to the southwest of the city. The mountain for which the county is named, Mount Graham, is just a few miles southwest of the city. The mountain is home to the Mount Graham International Observatory (MGIO) and Large Binocular Telescope, or LBT. The mountain is also home to the Vatican Advanced Technology Telescope, or VATT, and the Heinrich Hertz Submillimeter Telescope, or SMT. The Mount Graham International Observatory complex is operated by the University of Arizona.

== Notable people ==
- D. J. Carrasco, professional baseball player in Major League Baseball
- Michael Ensign, actor
- Justin Gaethje, mixed martial artist, Ultimate Fighting Championship (UFC) Lightweight Champion
- Spencer W. Kimball, president of the Church of Jesus Christ of Latter-day Saints, 1973–1985, lived and raised his family in Safford
- Matthew Lopez, mixed martial artist
- Carol Lee MacDonald, Arizona state senator in 1987
- Fred Mortensen, former professional football player in the National Football League (NFL)
- Dale Smith, team roping world champion, Rodeo Hall of Famer
