= Charles Bolsius House =

- Charles Bolsius House; Site No. HD 5–26
- U.S. National Register of Historic Places
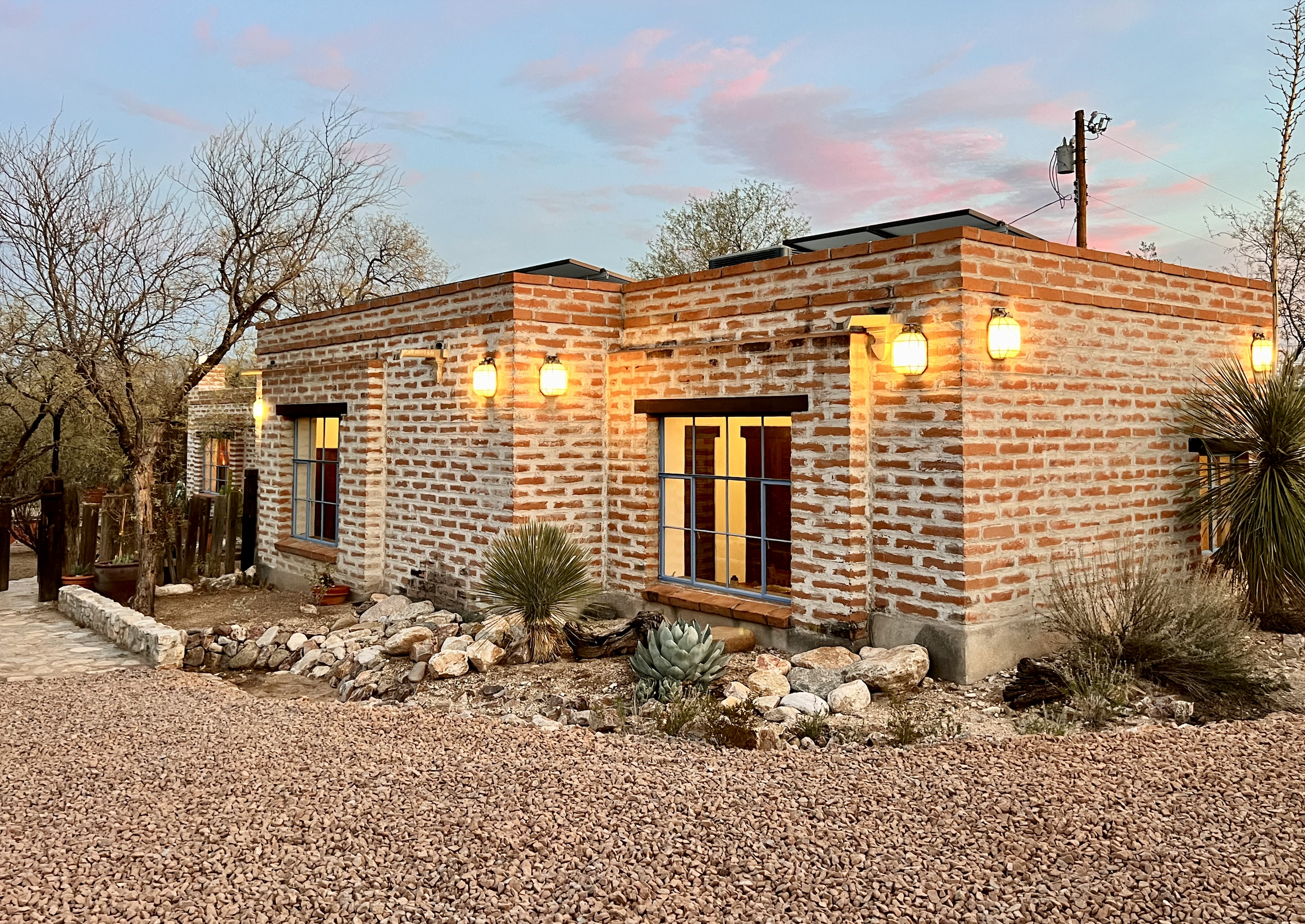
- Charles Bolsius House, North Elevation, 2024

- Location within Arizona Location within the United States
- Location: 5495 E. Fort Lowell Rd., Tucson, Arizona
- Coordinates: 32°15′44″N 110°52′33″W
- Area: 1.1 acres (0.45 ha)
- Built: c. 1880
- Architect: Charles Bolsius 1948 / 1961 /1967
- Architectural style: Sonoran, Territorial Revival and Pueblo Revival
- MPS: Fort Lowell MRA
- NRHP reference No.: 78003360
- Added to NRHP: December 13, 1978

Charles Bolsius House, also called "Casa Bienvenidos", is a significant example of the architectural work of artist and designer Charles Bolsius and an important example of Territorial Revival design in the American Southwest. It is located in the City of Tucson, Arizona, within the Old Fort Lowell Historic District.

The rambling burnt adobe house was constructed around an unstabilized mud adobe storehouse-workshop that dates from the Fort Lowell period c. 1880. The house was hand built by Bolsius in multiple phases over three decades.

The project, built as Bolsius's own home, provided an opportunity for experimentation and design exploration. The house includes his iconic and hallmark hand-carved doors, exposed beams, carved corbels, adobe fireplaces, hand-hammered tin and copper, and a heightened sense of American Western romanticism. The property typifies the architectural sensibilities of the American West during the 20th century and straddles the pre-and post-WWII period. The use of exposed burnt adobe, a popular regional building material in the mid-20th century, gives the exterior of the home a modern sensibility while the interior is a classic Pueblo Revival approach typical of the early half of the 20th century.

== History ==
The Charles Bolsius House was originally a small adobe storehouse-workshop located on the property of the Fort Lowell Quartermaster and Commissary Storehouse known as El Cuartel Viejo.

As noted in the Cultural Resources Assessment for the Fort Lowell Park written by historian J. Homer Thiel in 2009:

The quartermaster and commissary storehouse stood at the northwestern side of the parade ground. Today, portions of the storehouse are incorporated into apartments created by members of the Bolsius family in the 1940s. The building contained six rooms and 6,000 sq ft [560 m^{2}]. It was used to store provisions, ammunition, and other goods. The front of the building measured about 240 by 18 feet [73.2 by 5.5 m] with extensions running to the north measuring 100 by 18 feet [30.5 by 5.5 m]. In 1879, it was noted that roofing of the building leaked "considerably during rainy weather" and that 80 "new vegas" were needed to repair this problem (1879 Inspection Report, MS 266, AMS). The commissary issue room, which measured 35 by 18 feet [10.7 by 5.5 m], had received a wooden floor in the previous year, and other rooms remained unfloored. One wing of the storehouse had a cellar that was 18 feet [5.5 m] wide by 63 feet [19 m] long. This was used by the Subsistence Department to store food. Today, the cellar is visible as a partially filled depression with portions of its rock walls still visible. In 1882, the tin roof for this building was reported to be in bad repair. It was also recommended that a cloth manta ceiling be installed in the commissary rooms. In 1883, new window sashes were required in some of the storerooms and issue rooms. The storerooms had been floored in the previous year. The 1887 inspection report noted that the ceilings needed to be plastered but that the building was in fair condition. The 1889 inspection noted that the building had four quartermaster storerooms, two rooms used by the ordinance officer, and two rooms and a cellar used for storage and issue by the Subsistence Department. A storage yard with 15-foot tall [4.6 m] adobe walls was present behind the building. ... On December 18, 1942, the [Ambus Barnet Earheart] sold the Quartermaster and Commissary Storehouse Property to members of the Bolsius family for $10.00 (Pima County DRE 275:61–62).

After the reconstruction and restoration of the Commissary ruins into El Cuartel Viejo, Bolsius began construction on the Charles Bolsius House following his return to Tucson after World War II.

The house is a rambling plan with large rooms, white plaster walls, steel casement windows, concrete floors, and beamed ceilings. The large salon living room was added in 1961 and additional rooms including the dining room, main bedroom, and sitting room were added between 1961 and 1967. Surrounded by old-grown mesquite trees, the north façade of the Bolsius House, although not viewable from the street, is the principal elevation of the property. The façade is characterized by slow-slung horizontal missing with varying parapet roof heights. The exposed burnt adobe is treated with a sack mortar wash which was typical stylistic treatment in Tucson during the 1930s–1960s.

Bolsius used the house as an artist's studio and completed many of his noted and famous paintings while living in the home. In 1979, the house was purchased from Charles and Leonora Bolsius by Los Angeles and New York couple Judy and Paul Clinco and was the childhood home of Demion Clinco. In the 1980s, they added a west wing to the house that drew on the Bolsius design tenets.

The Charles Bolsius House was designated a contributing property to the Pima County Fort Lowell Historic District in 1976 and was individually listed in the National Register of Historic Places as part of the Fort Lowell Multiple Resource Area in December 1978. The property is today included in the City of Tucson Fort Lowell Historic Preservation Zone, designated in 1981.
