= The LeaChar House =

- LeaChar House/Second Charles Bolsius House
- Location: 1771 North King Street, Tucson, Arizona
- Area: 1.74 acres (0.70 ha)
- Built: c. 1979
- Architect: Charles Bolsius 1979
- Architectural style: Sonoran, Territorial Revival

LeaChar House is an architectural landmark, exemplifying late-20th-century Arizona Territorial Revival architecture style and serving as the final masterpiece of the architectural designer and artist, Charles Bolsius. Situated on the eastern outskirts of Tucson, Arizona, within the historically significant Tanque Verde, Arizona village area, off "Tanque Verde Loop" the LeaChar House occupies a tranquil setting amidst verdant mesquite trees part of a bosque along the banks of Tanque Verde Creek. This natural environment evokes the charm and rural landscapes surrounding Fort Lowell, where Bolsius resided prior to the urban expansion of Tucson in the mid-20th century.

== History ==
Constructed in 1979 on 1.59 acres (0.64 ha) as the personal residence of Dutch-born Arizona artist Charles Bolsius and his wife Leora, the LeaChar House showcases many of the distinctive architectural motifs and craftsmanship techniques that Bolsius honed throughout his career. Crafted from burnt adobe treated with a sack mortar wash. The exterior embodies the characteristics of early-20th-century design principles and materials including Bolsius's signature hand-carved doors, corbels, plank and beamed ceilings, corner fireplaces, and steel casement windows.

Evolving with the architectural trends of the late 20th century, the LeaChar House incorporates a more contemporary floor plan characterized by a seamless integration of the living room and dining area, enhancing the residence's sense of openness and connectivity. Notably, a screened patio known as the "Arizona Room" is attached to the side elevation of the house. The carved patio wood work was repurposed from salvaged components of the original gates of Las Saetas, adding a touch of historical significance and design continuity to the property.

The name "LeaChar" is a fusion of Leanora and Charles, reflecting the deeply personal nature of this project for the Bolsius couple. The couple also maintained a cabin called "Château Leachar" on nearby Mount Lemmon in Willow Canyon, which was they purchased in 1972, and burnt down in 2003 as part of the Aspen Fire. Charles Bolsius died in March 1983, shortly after the completion of the LeaChar House. Leora Bolsius resided in the home until 2008.
