= Charles Bolsius =

Dutch American painter (1907–1983)

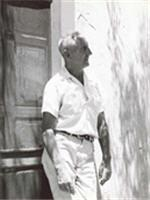
- Born: Charles William Bolsius; June 23, 1907 's-Hertogenbosch, Netherlands
- Died: March 23, 1983 (aged 75); Tucson, Arizona
- Education: Royal Academy of Art in the Hague
- Known for: Painting; Furniture design; Printmaking; Woodcarving
- Movement: Exprestionism, Impresionism, Social Realism

Charles William Bolsius (June 23, 1907 – March 23, 1983) was a Dutch-born American painter. He was born in 's-Hertogenbosch, the Netherlands, the youngest in an upper-middle-class bourgeoisie family. His father ran the regional Gas Works and Bolsius formally studied art in The Hague before emigrating to the United States and moving to New Mexico in the early 1930s. He quickly assimilated into the art communities of Albuquerque and Santa Fe showing with the significant artist of the period. Bolsius had artistically matured within Dutch - German Expressionism. His woodblock handprints, using subject matter from the American West, capitalized on flat, bold, stark patterns and rough-hewn effects that were hallmarks of the expressionist woodblock tradition. His heavy light-filled moody paintings with cloudy brooding skies combined expressionistic influences with expansive western landscapes and the optimism of American impressionism. His work was critically recognized and exhibited at major museums and galleries throughout New Mexico and Arizona.

Bolsius settled in Tucson in 1934. With his brother, Adrian "Pete" Bolsius, and sister-in-law Nan Bolsius the trio purchased the adobe ruins of the Fort Lowell Post Traders Store, (seven miles northeast of downtown Tucson) rebuilding it over the next decade into one of the great examples of Pueblo Revival architecture in Arizona. Together they established the Fort Lowell Arts Colony. Bolsius is known for his paintings, woodblock prints, architectural design, and hand-carved Spanish colonial revival furniture and doors.

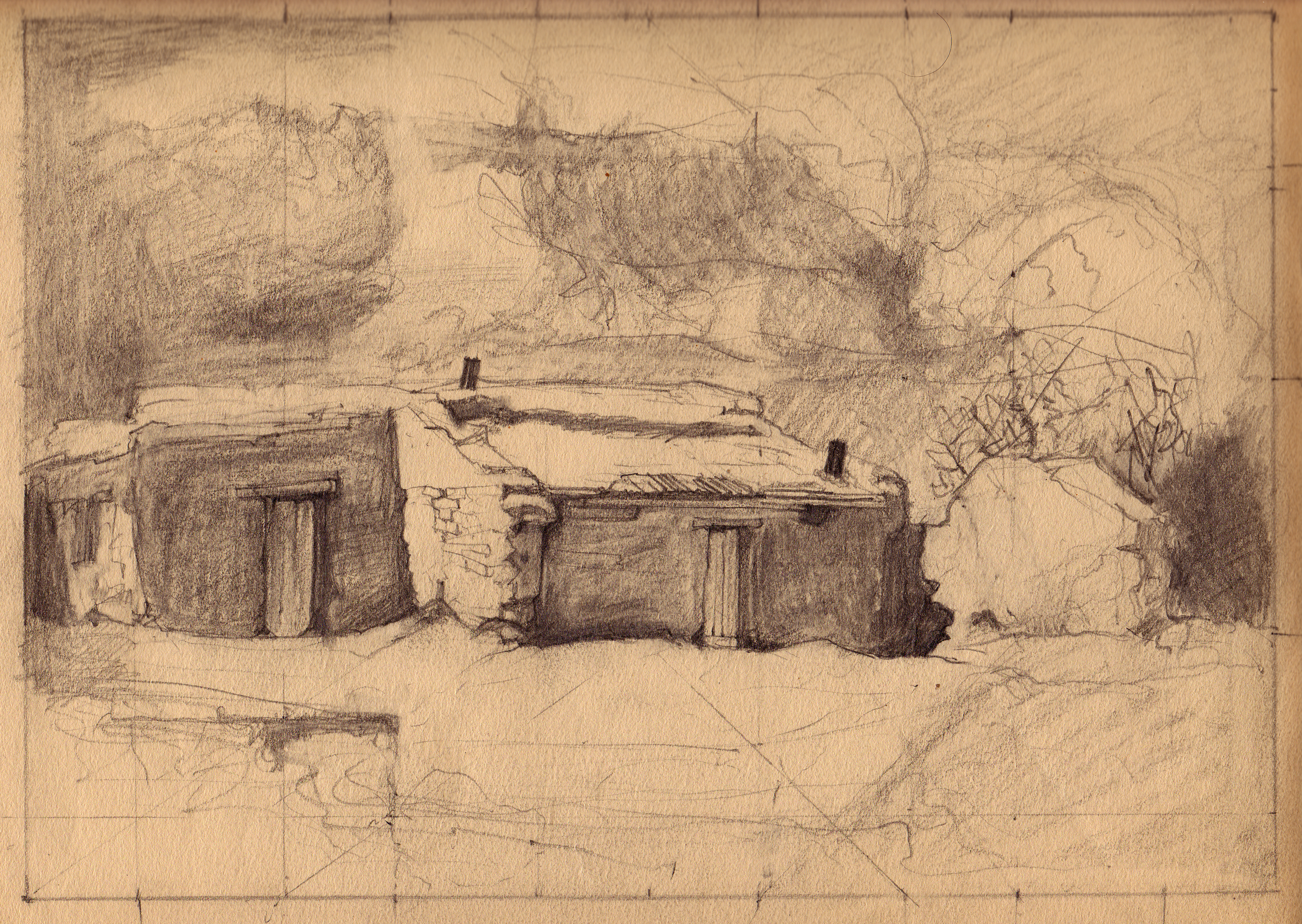
Charles Bolsius, drawing, New Mexico Adobe

== Early life and education ==
Charles Bolsius was born in 's-Hertogenbosch, Holland, to Caroline Maria Wilhelmei Bijvoet (1864–1935) and Petrus Nieduas Josephus Mariannus Bolsius (1859–1934). His family moved to the village of Voorburg in 1922. In 1924, at the age of 17, Charles enrolled in art school. He spent five years at the Koninklijke Academie van Beeldende Kunsten Den Haag (Royal Academy of Art, The Hague).

Bolsius's sophisticated artistic sensibility was influenced by German and Dutch expressionists including Leo Gestel, Jan Toorop, Kees van Dongen, and Emil Nolde. His known early work was primarily dramatic land- and cityscapes. His artistic ability and style developed within the school of Dutch and German Expressionism in the late 1920s and these stylistic threads would continue to permeate through and influence his entire artistic career. At 23 years old Bolsius left Holland and headed to the United States to stay with his Brother Adrian “Pete” Bolsius and his wife Nan Bolsius in Albuquerque.

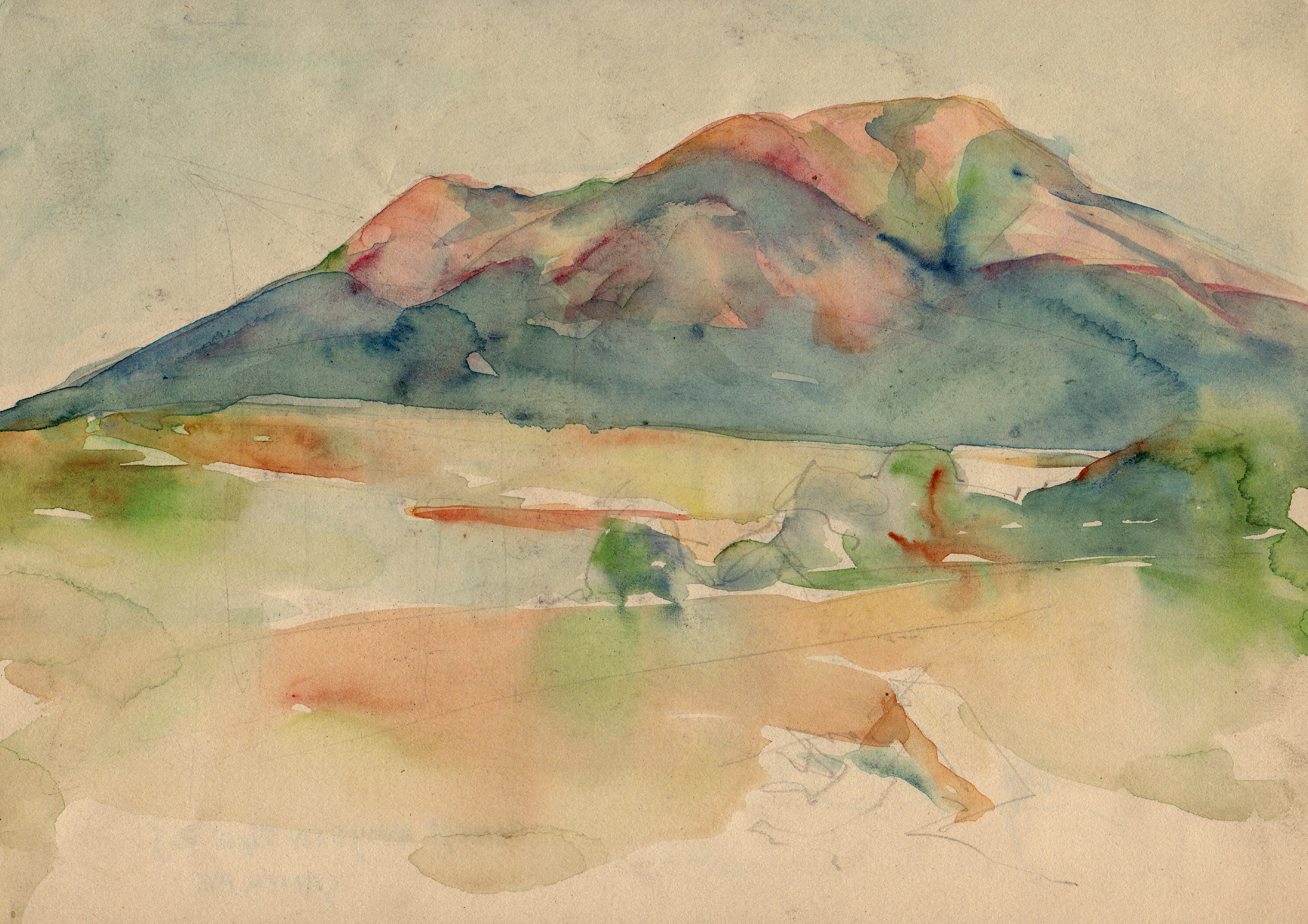
Watercolor by Charles Bolsius

== Career ==
The 23-year old Bolsius arrived at the port of San Pedro, Los Angeles California, on October 28, 1930. Arriving in the western United States, Bolsius's art began to embrace the scale and environmental tonality of the American West. He began painting the environment of New Mexico, and lived in Santa Fe, Albuquerque and in the Sandia Mountains in the village of San Antonito, Bernalillo County, New Mexico. During the early 1930s, he exhibited across the state and began receiving critical attention.

Charles Bolsius was part of, and significantly influenced by the art colony of Albuquerque, where he established connections with notable painters, including Carl Redin, Carl von Hassler, and Dorothea Fricke Whitcraft. Bolsius absorbed the distinct styles and perspectives of these artists, shaping his own artistic vision. Carl Redin's landscape mastery, Carl von Hassler's contributions to Southwest art, and Dorothea Frike Whitcraft's innovative use of color collectively enriched Bolsius' creative approach.

In the mid-1930s the Bolsius family moved to the San Francisco Bay Area before settling in Tucson, Arizona. On a sketching trip to the rural outskirts of Tucson in the farming community of Old Fort Lowell, Bolsius discovered the melting adobe ruins of the 1873 Fort Post Traders Store. He brought his brother and sister-in-law back to the site and after a lengthy discussion, the tree decided to make an offer and embark on re-constructing the dilapidated rambling building.

The project received local and national attention, was published in journals, and newspapers and became a cultural hub. The project, named Las Saetas was recognized as an important example of Pueblo Revival architectural design and was photographed by numerous noted architectural photographers.

Bolsius continued to produce and show his art through the 1930s and 1940s, exhibiting in Arizona, New Mexico, Utah, and San Francisco. Bolsius served in WWII. Returning home from the European theater he worked with Nan on the reconstruction of the Fort Lowell Commissary naming the project El Cuartel Viejo The Old Barracks. After the completion of that project, he designed and built his own home, the Charles Bolsius House over a three decade period. Bolsius was a member of many Tucson art organizations. The architectural projects had created a vehicle to develop and hone a Spanish colonial revival wood carving skill that was rooted in the New Mexico WPA furniture movement. He began professionally producing doors and furniture in the 1940s which continued through the 1970s. His final building project was the burnt adobe, late Territorial Revival The LeaChar House in the Tanque Verde, Arizona area east of Tucson. The final project included classic hand carved woodwork and doors. The screened Arizona Room was constructed of the dismantled gate that had original been created for Las Saetas.

His woodwork can be seen throughout the old Fort Lowell Historic District, Arizona State University Louise Lincoln Kerr House and Studio, in homes in Tucson's Catalina Foothills (including the front door of 2540 East Camino La Zorrela), the Church Doors of Sasabe, Arizona (which were lent out to the film Lilies of the Field) and the dining room table at Rancho De La Osa in Sasabe, Arizona.

Bolsius died in March 1983 in Tucson, Pima County, Arizona.

== Legacy ==
Bolsius's major architectural work and examples of his carved doors are clustered in the Old Fort Lowell Historic District in Tucson, Arizona. The rebuilt Fort Lowell Commissary that he named El Cuartel Viejo was purchased by the City of Tucson with major restoration anticipated in 2024-2025. The buildings will be open to the public as part of the cultural multi-million dollar redevelopment and historic imperative program for Fort Lowell Park.

Although Bolsius showed widely in New Mexico and Arizona in the 1930 and 1940s he did not pressure rigorous promotion or sale of his art. As a result, his paintings are all privately owned and currently not part of any public permanent collection.

== Art exhibitions ==
- 1931, Sandia Park Store, Sandia Mountains, New Mexico
- 1932, Museum of New Mexico, Annual Exhibition Painters and Sculptors of the Southwest, Santa Fe, New Mexico
- 1932, Museum of New Mexico, Paintings by “Sheldon Parsons, Carl Bolsius, and Hubert Rogers,” Santa Fe, New Mexico
- 1932, Santa Fe Museum, Exhibit of Bolsius's paintings and woodblocks, Santa Fe, New Mexico
- 1932, Romero Gallery, Southwestern Artists, Albuquerque, New Mexico
- 1933, The University of New Mexico, Art League of New Mexico, Group Show, Albuquerque, New Mexico
- 1933, Romero Gallery, Albuquerque Society of Artists First Annual Exhibit, Albuquerque, New Mexico
- 1934, Carlito Springs Dining Room, Tijeras Canyon, New Mexico
- 1934, Museum of New Mexico, Annual Exhibition Painters and Sculptors of the Southwest, Santa Fe, New Mexico
- 1934, Beach Auditorium, Santa Cruz Art League Statewide Art Exhibit, Santa Cruz, California
- 1938, Tucson Fine Arts Association, Art Rental Association
- 1939, The University of Arizona Art Department, The Paintings of Charles Bolsius, Tucson, Arizona
- 1940, Women's Club Silver Tea Exhibition, Las Sientas, Tucson, Arizona
- 1940, Temple Art Gallery, Tucson Fine Arts Association 4th Annual Old Pueblo Open Show, Tucson, Arizona
- 1940, Studio Strange, Tucson, Arizona
- 1940, Tucson Center of Arts and Crafts, Tucson, Arizona
- 1941, Temple Art Gallery, Palette and Brush Show, Tucson, Arizona
- 1941, Tucson Fine Arts Association, Tucson, Arizona
- 1941, Temple Art Gallery, Exhibition of Southwestern Oils, Tucson, Arizona
- 1942, Springville Annual National Art Exhibit, Springerville, Utah
- 1943, Museum of New Mexico, Olive Rush, Helen Needham, Caroline Pickard, Charles Bolsius, J. H. Sharp, Santa Fe, New Mexico.
- 1944, Aiea Hospital WWII Collection, Aiea Hospital at Pearl Harbor, Hawaii
- 1946, Springville Annual National Art Exhibit, Springerville, Utah
- 1947, Springville Annual National Art Exhibit, Springerville, Utah
- 1947, Southern Arizona Bank And Trust Gallery, Tucson, Arizona
- 1947, Gumps, San Francisco, California
- 1949, Arizona State Fair, Art Exhibition, Phoenix, Arizona

== Architectural works ==
Bolsius designed and built only a handful of architectural projects. He worked with architectural designer Veronica Hughart, who incorporated his doors and woodwork into her projects. Following is a list of some of Bolsius's most important works, which are located in Tucson unless otherwise noted.

- Las Saetas, redesign and construction of Fort Lowell Post Traders Store, Old Fort Lowell (1934)
- El Cuartel Viejo, redesign and construction of Fort Lowell Commissary, Old Fort Lowell (1942–1949)
- The Charles Bolsius House, Old Fort Lowell (1949–1972)
- The LeaChar House, 1771 North King Street, Tanque Verde, Tucson, Arizona (1979)

== Doors and woodwork ==
- Santa Helena Chapel (also called Church of San Fernando and Sasabe Chapel), Sasabe, Arizona (1941) Church designed by Dickerson Jenkins, manager of the Rancho de la Osa, Doors commissioned by Mrs. High Carlton. (removed; located inside building)
- Issadro O. Ochoa House / Louise M. Murray Casita / Harrington House, 5328 E Fort Lowell Road (Old Fort Lowell), Tucson, Arizona (1948)
- Louise Lincoln Kerr House and Studio, 6110 N Scottsdale Rd, Scottsdale, Arizona (1948–1959)
- Casita Mesquite, 4500 North Camino Del Obispo, Tucson Arizona (1956), Bolsius Doors (1970)
- S. Bayard Colgate House, 4100 North Avenida Del Cazador, Flecha Caída Estates, Tucson, Arizona (1959)
- Backus Otto House, 2540 East Camino La Zorrela, Tucson, Arizona (1959) (removed in 2025; current whereabouts unknown)
- Winifred E. and Daniel R. Davies House, 4100 Avenida Del Cazador, Flecha Caída Estates, Tucson Arizona, (1959)
- Casa Cheruy, 3031 North Craycroft Road, (Old Fort Lowell), Tucson, Arizona, Veronica Hughart designed addition with Bolsius door (c. 1965)(removed; current whereabouts unknown)
- Nora and Dr. James W. Pickrell Ranch, Nogales Arizona, Veronica Hughart designed (1965)
- Kathryn L. and Horace B. Woodward House, 2841 North Orlando Avenue, (Old Fort Lowell) Tucson, Arizona (1969)
- Cross Farm, 5825 East Cloud Road, Tucson, Arizona, Veronica Hughart designed (1969)
- Priscilla G. Timpkin Estate, 8451 East Cloud Road, Tucson, Arizona, Veronica Hughart designed (1969)
- Episcopal Chapel of the Resurrection, 7110 South 12th Avenue, Tucson, Arizona, Church designed by Gordon Luepke (1964) (removed; current whereabouts unknown)
- Helen and Arthur Olaf Andersen House, 5505 North Camino Escuela, Tucson, Arizona (Doors). Veronica Hughart designed, Bolsius doors (1972)
- Henry Hitchcock House, 6315 East Miramar Drive, Tucson Country Club, Tucson, Arizona, Veronica Hughart designed, Bolsius doors (1972)
