= Juan Cristobal Armijo Homestead =

- U.S. National Register of Historic Places
- NM State Register of Cultural Properties
- Location within New Mexico
- Location: 207 Griegos Rd., NE, Albuquerque, New Mexico
- Coordinates: 35°07′42″N 106°37′59″W
- Area: 9.5 acres (3.8 ha)
- Built: 1875
- Architectural style: Territorial
- MPS: Albuquerque North Valley MRA
- NRHP reference No.: 82003309
- NMSRCP No.: 586

Significant dates
- Added to NRHP: September 30, 1982
- Designated NMSRCP: January 20, 1978

The Juan Cristobal Armijo Homestead, at 207 Griegos Rd., NE in Albuquerque, New Mexico, was built in 1875. It was listed on the New Mexico State Register of Cultural Properties in 1978 and the National Register of Historic Places in 1982. The listing included four contributing buildings and a contributing structure on 9.5 acres (3.8 ha).

It has also been known as Outlook Ranch and as Hacienda del Lago. It is a Territorial hacienda, built of terrones (sod bricks) with multiple rooms surrounding a placita.

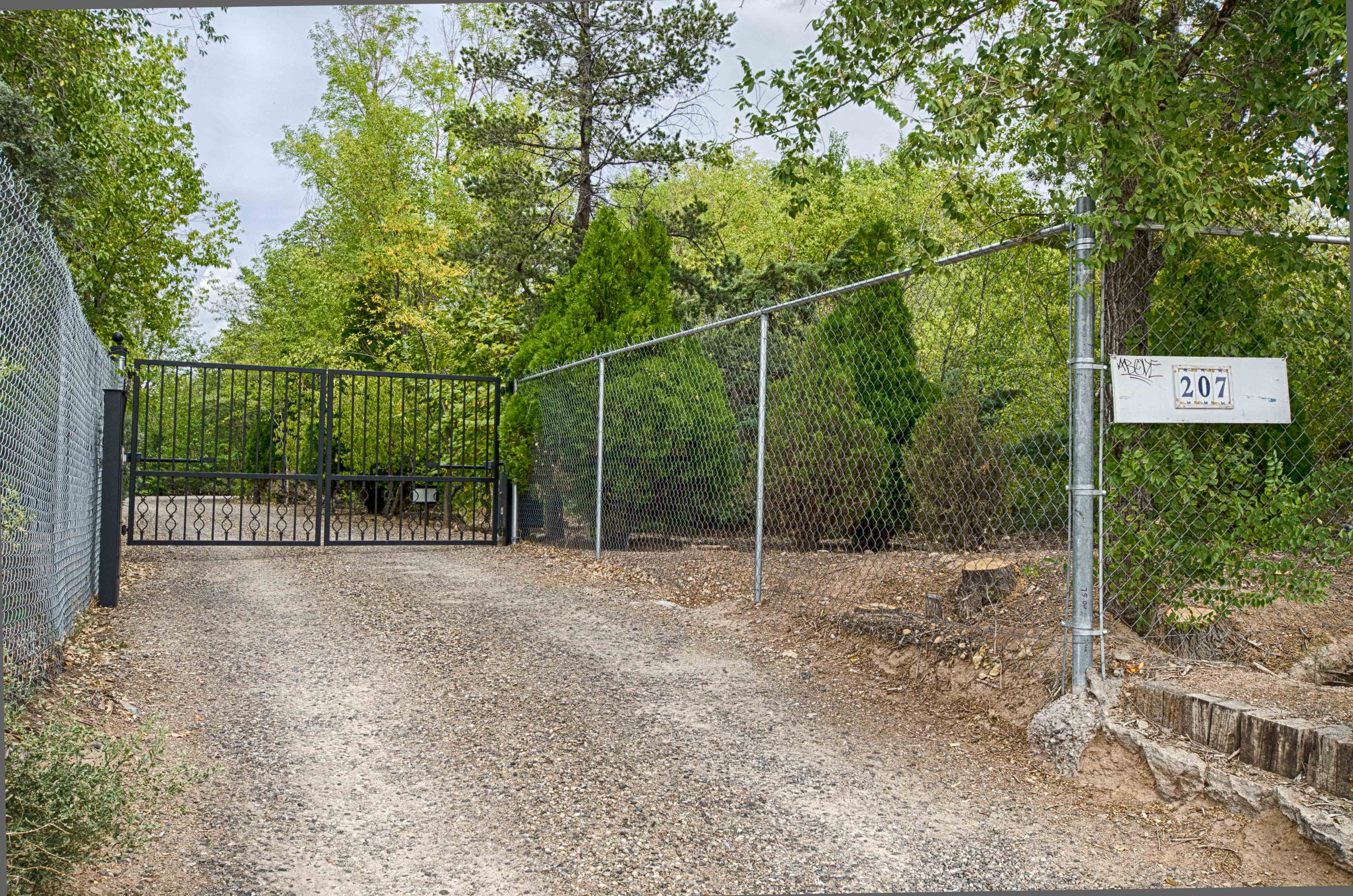
Chain link fencing at an entrance to the property

The house is set back in the property and screened by trees and shrubberies. The property includes a man-made pond created around 1950, which gives the property its "Hacienda del Lago" name. It is adjacent to another historic property, the Juan de Dios Chavez House.
