= Juan de Dios Chavez House =

Historic house in New Mexico, United States

- U.S. National Register of Historic Places
- NM State Register of Cultural Properties
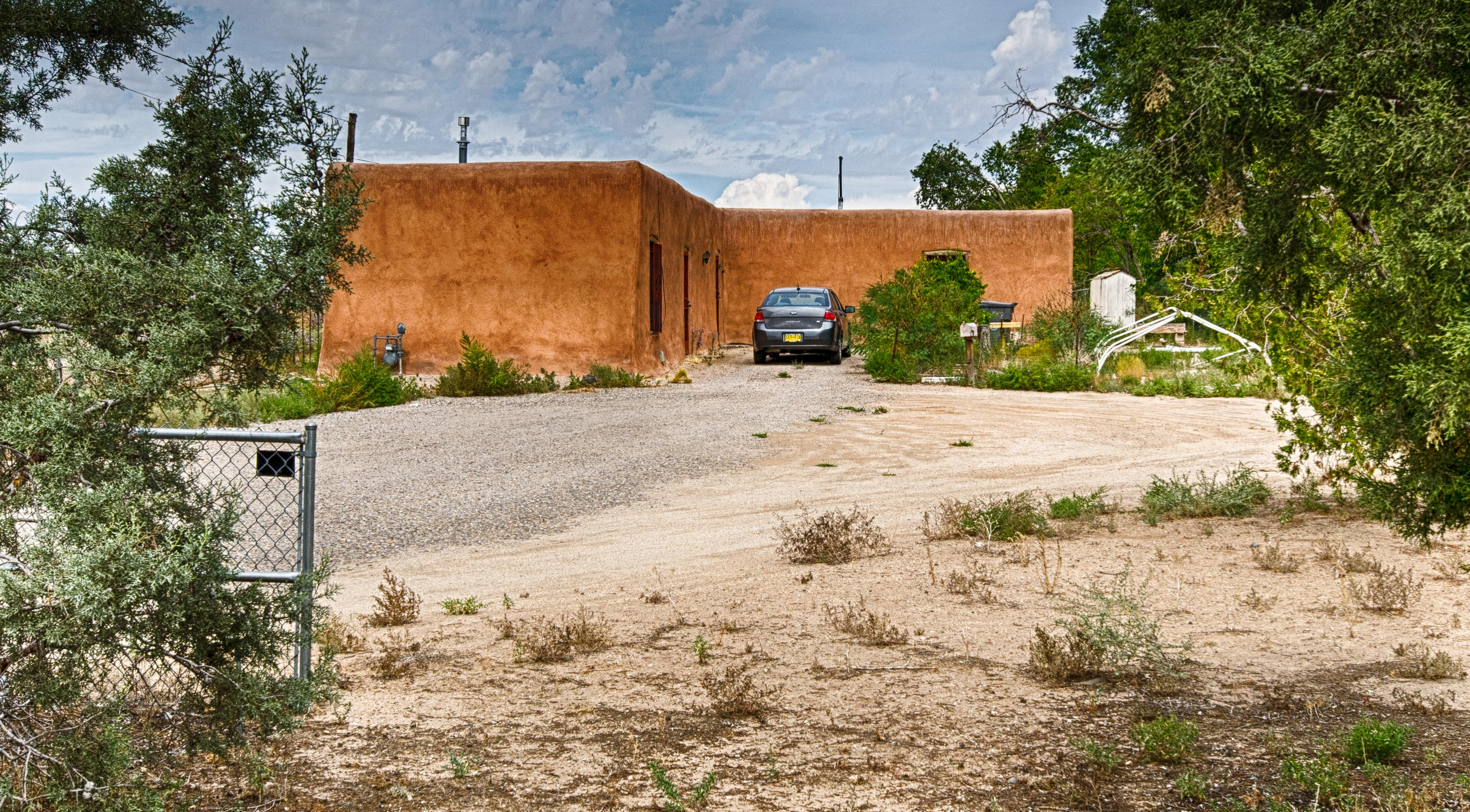
- The house in 2012

- Location within New Mexico Location within the United States
- Location: 205 Griegos Rd. NW, Albuquerque, New Mexico
- Coordinates: 35°7′42″N 106°37′58″W
- Architectural style: Territorial
- NRHP reference No.: 84002847
- NMSRCP No.: 939

Significant dates
- Added to NRHP: February 9, 1984
- Designated NMSRCP: August 25, 1983

The Juan de Dios Chavez House is a historic house in Albuquerque, New Mexico. The date of construction is unknown but it was probably built sometime before 1875. The property was part of the land on which Juan Cristobal Armijo built his "New Homestead" around that time, and the Juan de Dios Chavez House is thought to be older based on its architecture. Juan de Dios Chavez, who belonged to an old North Valley family, acquired the house in the early 20th century. The house was added to the New Mexico State Register of Cultural Properties in 1983 and the National Register of Historic Places in 1984.

The house is a one-story, flat-roofed building constructed from terrones, large adobe bricks, with outer walls 24 inches (61 cm) thick. It contains four rooms arranged in an L shape, with three rooms on the west side and one room on the east side. There is a double wall between the two sections, suggesting that they may originally have been separate buildings. Each room originally had a separate exterior door, but some were later converted into windows. Two of the rooms have original ceilings with round vigas.
