= Our Lady of Mt. Carmel Church =

Historic church in New Mexico, United States

- U.S. National Register of Historic Places
- NM State Register of Cultural Properties
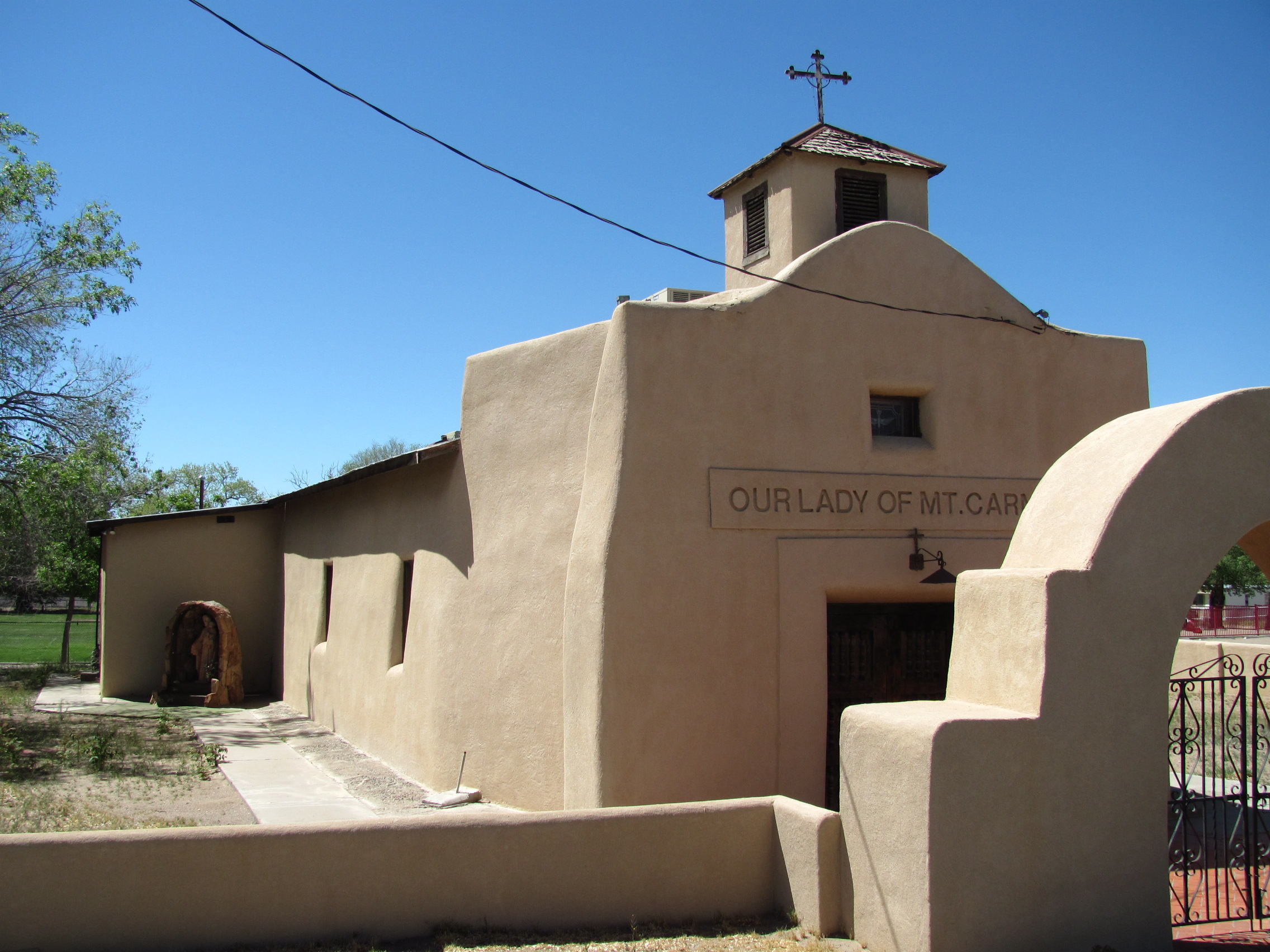

- Location within New Mexico Location within the United States
- Location: 7813 Edith Blvd., NE, Albuquerque, New Mexico
- Coordinates: 35°10′8″N 106°37′3″W
- Area: 0.1 acres (0.040 ha)
- Built: 1870
- Architectural style: Vernacular Pueblo Revival
- MPS: Albuquerque North Valley MRA
- NRHP reference No.: 84002884
- NMSRCP No.: 414

Significant dates
- Added to NRHP: February 9, 1984
- Designated NMSRCP: October 3, 1975

Our Lady of Mt. Carmel Church is a historic church building in Albuquerque, New Mexico. It was built in 1870 in a Vernacular Pueblo Revival style. The building was added to the National Register of Historic Places in 1984.
