= Pueblo architecture =

Architectural style in the Southwestern US

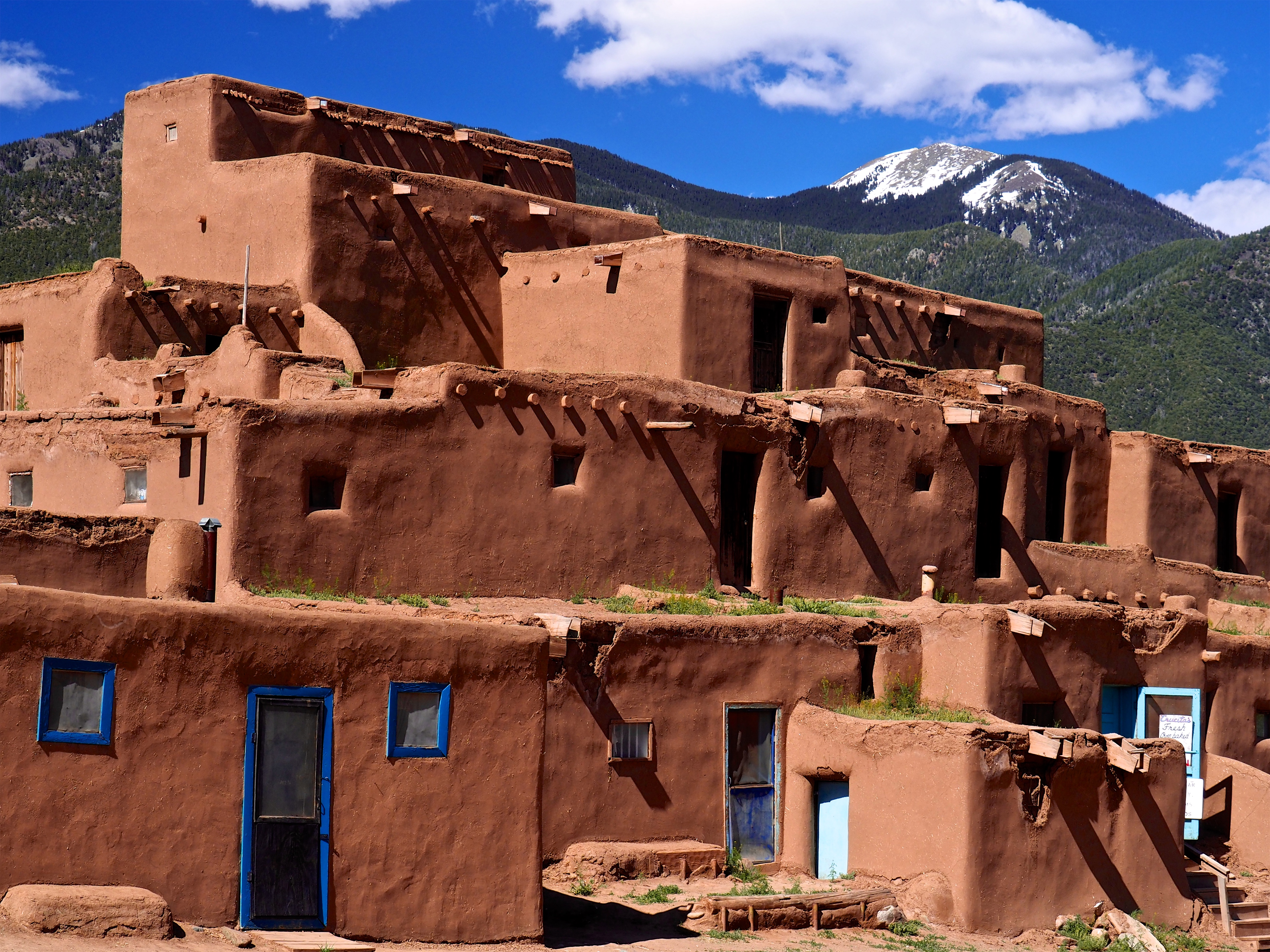
Taos Pueblo, one of the most famous examples of Pueblo architecture

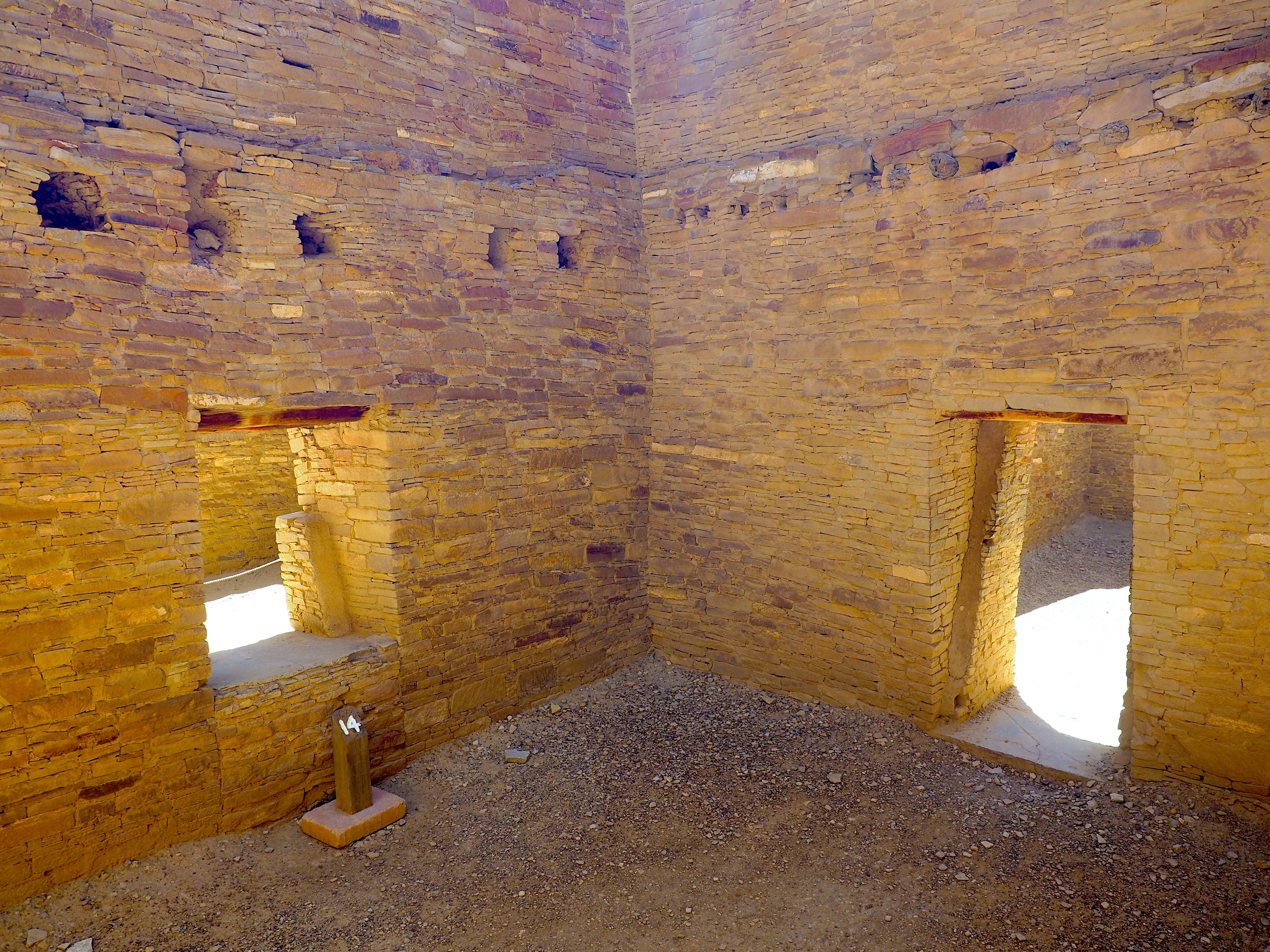
Architectural detail of Pueblo Bonito, constructed between 850 and 1150 CE

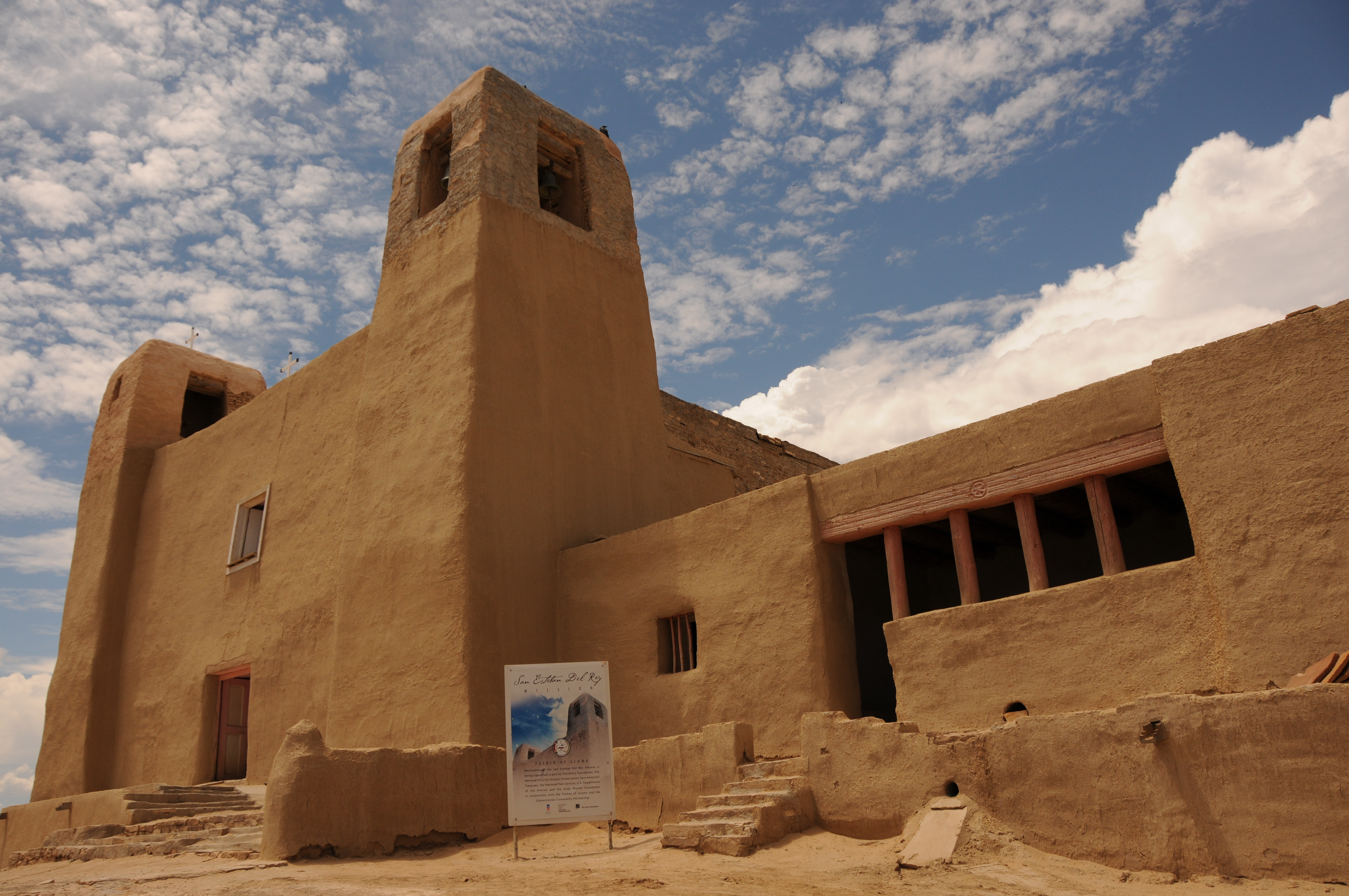
San Estévan del Rey Mission Church (1629) at Acoma Pueblo, an example of Spanish colonial architecture incorporating traditional Puebloan construction techniques

Pueblo architecture refers to the traditional architecture of the Pueblo people in what is now the Southwestern United States, especially New Mexico. Many of the same building techniques were later adapted by the Hispanos of New Mexico into the Territorial Style. Pueblo and Hispano architecture was also the basis for the Pueblo Revival architecture and Territorial Revival architecture, 20th-century Southwestern regional styles that remain popular.

== History ==
Ancestral Puebloan people first began building pueblo structures during the Pueblo I Period (750–900 CE). When Spanish colonists arrived in the Southwest beginning in the late 1500s, they learned the local construction techniques from the Pueblo people and adapted them to fit their own building types, such as haciendas and mission churches. The Pueblo people also adopted some of the Spanish innovations, including the manufacturing of sun-baked adobe bricks. As modern building materials like brick, glass, and milled lumber became more available during the Territorial period and especially with the arrival of railroads in the 1870s and 1880s, the traditional construction methods fell out of favor, though they remained commonplace at the pueblos themselves and in other rural areas. Pueblo architecture experienced a resurgence in the 1920s and 1930s as a romanticized revival style, Pueblo Revival, and remains popular in New Mexico.

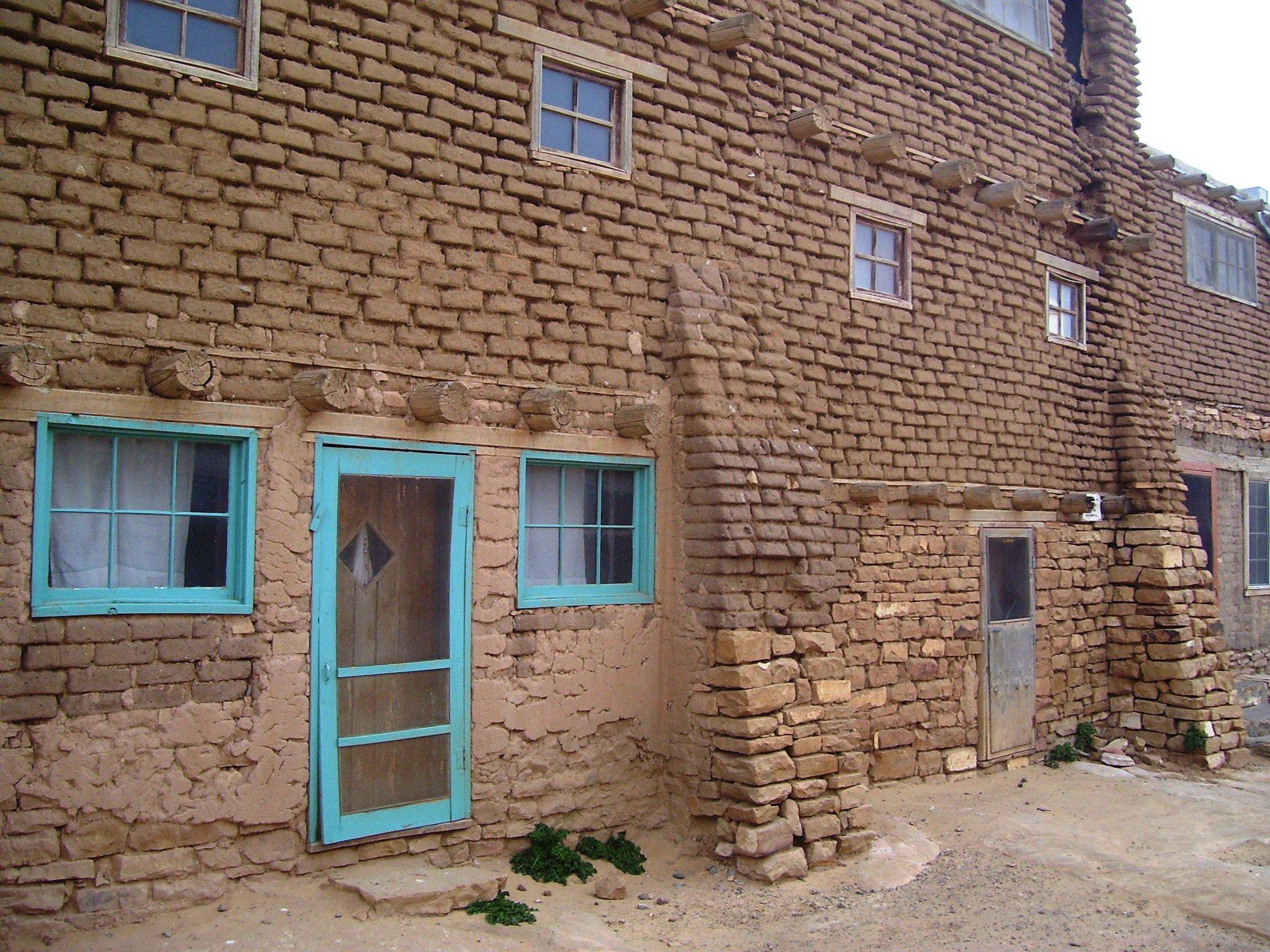
A buttressed wall at Acoma Pueblo showing both adobe and stone construction in the same building.

== Characteristics ==
Pueblo buildings are most commonly constructed from adobe, though stone was also used where available, for instance at Chaco Canyon. The buildings have flat roofs supported by rough-hewn wooden beams called vigas and smaller perpendicular laths or latillas. The vigas typically extend through the exterior wall surface. Larger structures often take the form of multistory terraces with setbacks at each level. Traditionally, upper floors were accessed by ladders, and buildings were often semi-fortified with minimal door and window openings at ground level. In modern practice, conventional doors and windows are more common, and were often retrofitted into older buildings. Other key elements of Pueblo architecture include kivas, which are circular ceremonial rooms which are partially or fully below ground, and enclosed courtyards or plazas. There is an emphasis on communal rather than private spaces, with the plaza at the center of the village and village life, while dwelling and storage areas are more utilitarian and are arranged around the periphery.

According to Santa Clara architect and historian, Rina Swentzell, Pueblo architecture can be understood in the context of "a world in which a house or structure is not an object—or a machine to live in—but is part of a cosmological world view that recognizes multiplicity, simultaneity, inclusiveness, and interconnectedness." In this tradition, buildings are seen as living entities with a finite lifespan, and "are 'fed' cornmeal after construction so that they may have a good life." The "center" is an important concept, with the plaza as both the physical center of the village and the metaphysical center of the universe:

The "heart of the earth" or bu-ping-geh (heart of the pueblo) for the Tewa people is the open community space within the village where ritual dances and other community activities happen. The bu-ping-geh contains the literal center of the earth, the nan-sipu, which translates as "the belly-root" of the earth. Each pueblo's cosmos encircles the nan-sipu, and the surrounding mountains, where the sky and earth touch, are the boundaries of the well-organized spaces in which people, animals, and spirits live.

The nan-sipu may be inconspicuously marked with stones. The idea of emergence from and return to the earth is also important, especially in the underground kivas and the ladders used to ascend from one level to another. Swentzell's daughter, sculptor Roxanne Swentzell, identified the pueblos' centuries-long connection to the landscape as another key aspect of Pueblo architecture:

You may watch a tree grow up from a little baby tree to a big tree and then cut it down and use it in your house for a viga. But you know that tree. It's your family. The dirt you go get to plaster or make your adobes with and stuff, it's just right there. So you know where the good dirt is and where the not-so-good dirt is. It's absolutely having a relationship.

== See also ==
- Ancestral Puebloan dwellings
- Pueblo Revival architecture
