= Carl Redin =

American artist (1892–1944)

- Born: June 15, 1892; Sweden
- Died: June 19, 1944 (aged 52); Los Gatos, California, U.S.
- Known for: Painter
- Movement: Tonalist, Impressionism

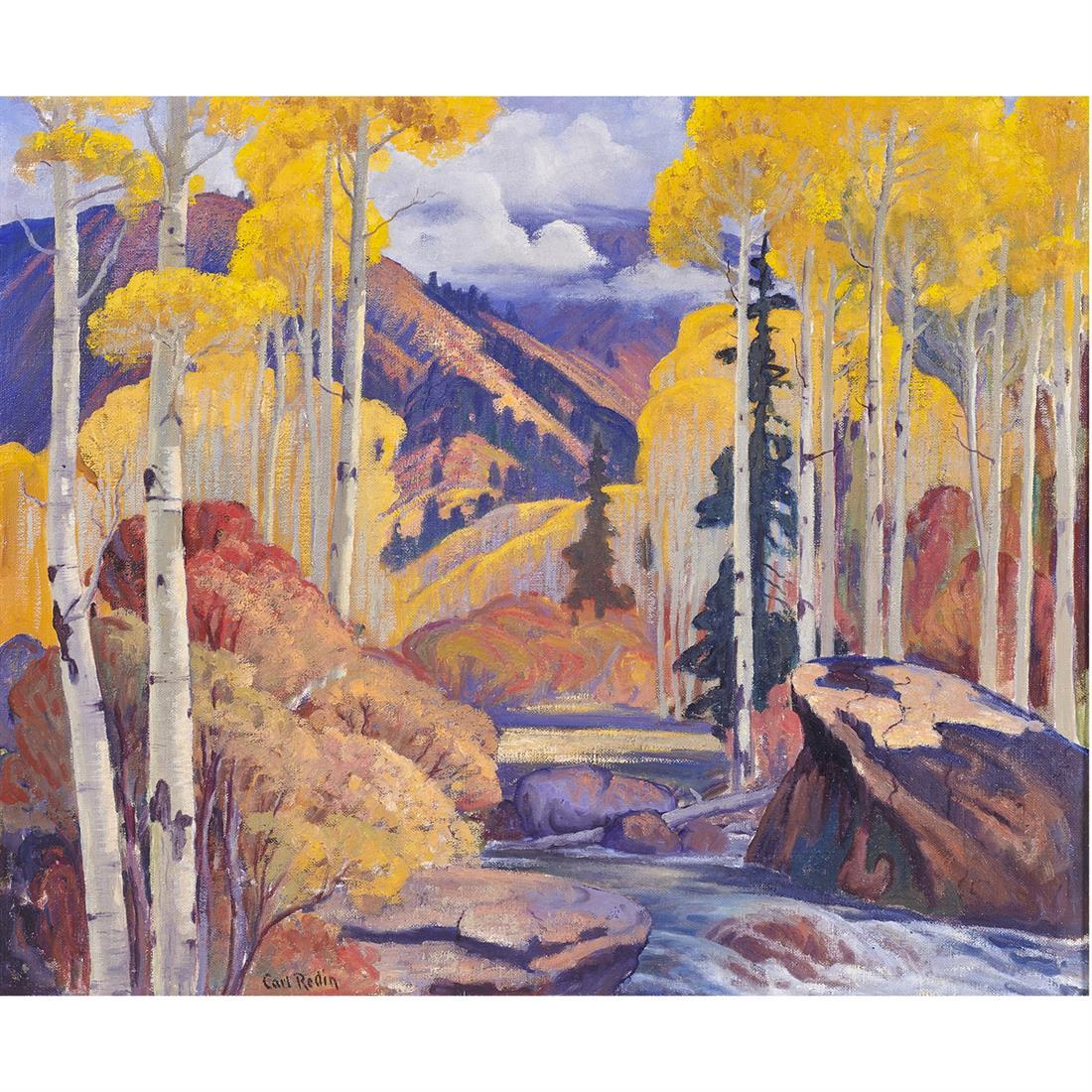
Mountain Stream in Autumn, oil on canvas, 20 x 24 in

Carl Redin (June 15, 1892 – June 19, 1944) was a Swedish-born American artist. He was known for his landscape paintings, and his body of work focused on the American West, with an emphasis on New Mexico, Albuquerque and its environs.

== Immigration to America and health struggles ==
In 1913, Redin emigrated to the United States. He settled in Chicago within a Swedish community, engaging in various jobs, including varnishing apartments and restoring church paintings. However, in 1916, Redin was diagnosed with tuberculosis.

Seeking a cure and a respite from the Midwest's damp climate, he boarded a train for the arid Southwest, ultimately finding treatment in Albuquerque's Methodist sanatorium. Redin's three-year convalescence not only restored his health but also let him return to his art, focusing on the vistas of the Southwest that would define his oeuvre. He exhibited his paintings in May 1919 at the Albuquerque Women's Club.

== Artistic career in Albuquerque ==
Residing in Albuquerque, Redin collaborated with fellow artists such as Ben Turner, Charles Bolsius, Nils Hogner, and Carl Von Hassler, who formed the city's community of artists. His first show in 1926, sponsored by the Albuquerque Women's Club, marked the beginning of a career characterized by financial insecurity, but was sustained by patrons like Dr. Carl Hagland and Howard Roosa.

Redin worked across the American Southwest. In February 1927 he traveled to Phoenix to paint the Superstition Mountains. In 1938 his exhibited his work at the Arizona Inn in Tucson, Arizona.

He painted during a time when New Mexico was marketing itself as an exotic getaway. His paintings adorned hotels, public buildings, and department stores.

== Later years and move to California ==
Facing deteriorating health, Redin left Albuquerque in 1941, seeking lower altitudes in California due to a diagnosed heart condition. Redin died on June 19, 1944.
