= El Cuartel Viejo =

- El Cuartel Viejo and Fort Lowell Quartermaster and Commissary Storehouse; El Cuartel Viejo
- U.S. National Register of Historic Places
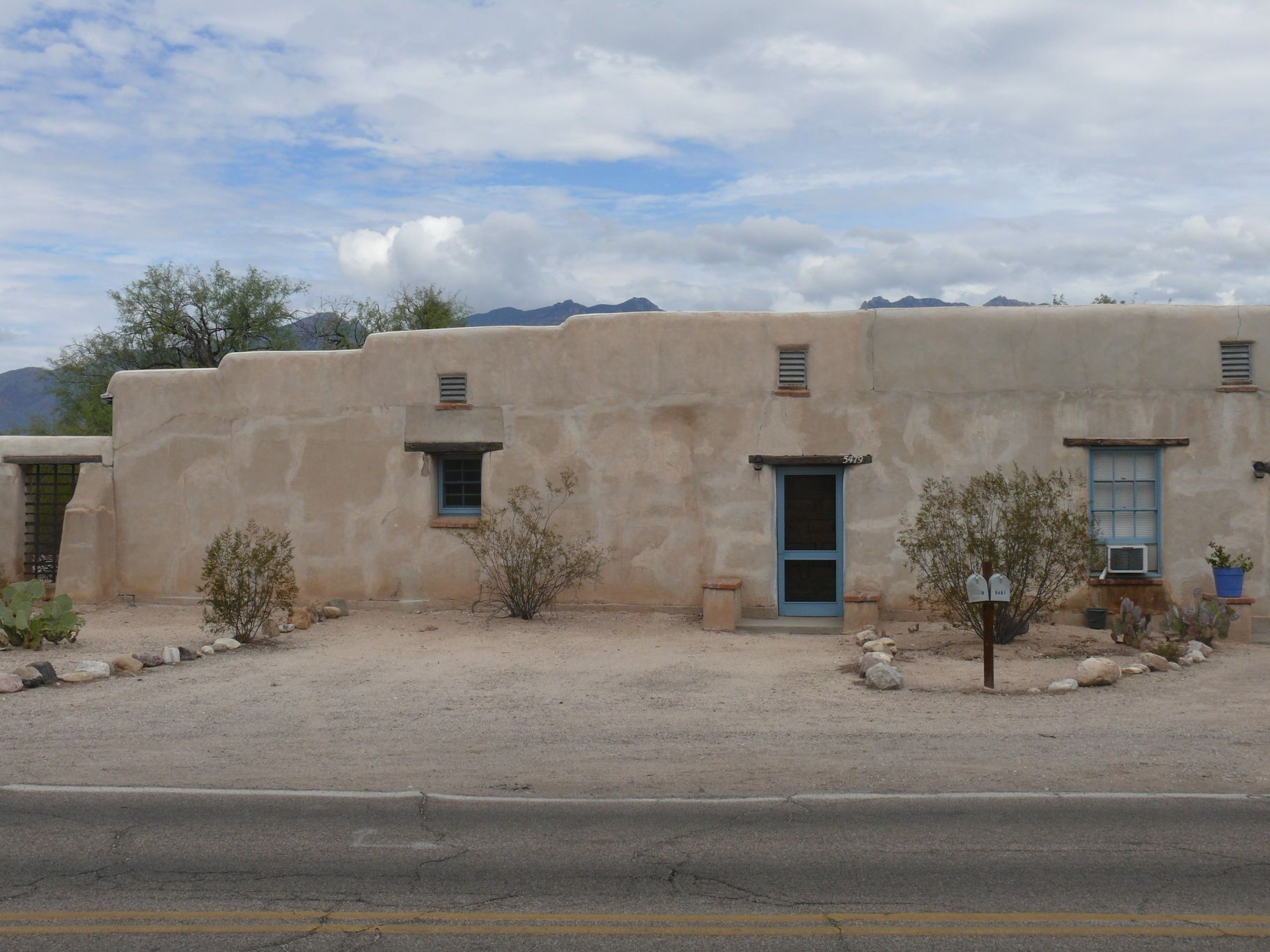

- Location within Arizona
- Location: 5477, 5479, 5481, 5483, and 5487 E. Fort Lowell Rd., Tucson, Arizona
- Coordinates: 32.26158°N 110.87563°W
- Area: 2.34 acres (0.95 ha)
- Built: 1879
- Architect: Charles Bolsius (1942 reconstruction start)
- Architectural style: Sonoran, Pueblo Revival
- MPS: Fort Lowell MRA
- NRHP reference No.: 78003369
- Added to NRHP: December 13, 1978

El Cuartel Viejo is a significant and important example of Pueblo Revival architecture in the American Southwest. Rebuilt starting in 1942 from the ruins of the 1870s Fort Lowell Quartermaster and Commissary Storehouse the design-build project was led by Dutch-born artist Charles Bolsius, with brother and sister-in-law Nan and Pete Bolsius. The project, a series of five residences, included distinctive hand-carved Bolsius doors, exposed beams, carved corbels, adobe fireplaces, hand-hammered tin, and a heightened sense of romanticism. The property like Las Saetas to the west and its transformation over a 150-year-span reflect the changing culture and economic milieu of Southern Arizona and the American West.

The property had successive owners and uses including a farm headquarters, storage, and farm laborer housing before falling to ruin. The rambling property was purchased by the Bolsius Family in 1942. Nan and Pete Bolsius and Artist Charles Bolsius reimagined the property as a Pueblo Revival retreat for artists, winter visitors, and friends. The Bolsius family hand-reconfigured and reconstructed the building. El Cuartel Viejo is located in the Fort Lowell Historic District in east-central Tucson, Arizona.

== History ==
El Cuartel Viejo was originally built as the Fort Lowell Quartermaster and Commissary Storehouse in the 1870s from unstabilized mud adobe in an Arizona territorial style. The building served as a strategic military supply function until the closure and decommissioning of the Fort. The building as part of a quarter section of property was sold by the United States Land Office to French board Severin Rambaud in 1897. A year later it was sold to Missouri-born Robert Dysart Cole who established a farming operation on the property. Cole invested in significant agricultural infrastructure including irrigation acequia which supported 25,000 strawberry plants. The Cole farm expanded to include 600 apple trees, chili, and cabbage. In October 1909, Cole sold the 90-acre ranch to H. Warren Shepard, a wealthy starch manufacturer from Merchantville, New Jersey, who paid $14,000. During this period, the adobe storehouse and commissary buildings were occupied by several Mexican families who called it comisario. Shepherd sold the farm in 1910, to Nellie and A. R. Swan, who, in turn, sold it to Frank St. John. In 1935, it was acquired by Mary and Ambus Barnet Earheart who owned the property for seven years, selling it, on December 18, 1942, to the Bolsius family.

When the Bolsius Family purchased the building in 1942 it was in ruin. They reconfigured the original program to create three buildings connected by a perimeter wall with a central access gate on the south facade. Using a Pueblo Revival approach they plastered the buildings in lime plaster and infused them with a high degree of detailed woodwork, elevating what had been military functional buildings into works of art that have come to define the style of the early 20th century Tucson. They named the completed property El Cuartel Viejo "The Old Barracks". to reflect its historic lineage to romantic origins.

The south facade of El Cuartel Viejo is the principal public view of the property. The facade is characterized by large irregular geometric massing of mud adobe walls rendered in lime plaster. The 1870s building was originally an exposed adobe structure with a flat roof and parapet. The facade had minimal ornamental detailing. The windows were trimmed in wood and included the territorial style triangular-shaped pedimented lintel, featuring either a plain fascia or one augmented by combinations of moldings.

Siblings Mike and Judy Margolis bought the property from the Bolsius family in the 1970s and the City of Tucson purchased the property from the Margolis family in the early 2000s,

El Cuartel Viejo was designated a contributing property to the Pima County Fort Lowell Historic District in 1976 and was individually listed in the National Register of Historic Places under the Fort Lowell Multi-Cultural District in April 1978. The property is today included in the City of Tucson Fort Lowell Historic Preservation Zone, designated in 1981.
