= Dorothea Fricke Whitcraft =

American printmaker and painter (1893–1969)

- Born: December 4, 1893; Hastings, Nebraska
- Died: January 26, 1969 (aged 75); Albuquerque, New Mexico
- Education: Art Institute of Chicago
- Known for: Painting, art education, printing

Dorothea Maria "Dora" Fricke Whitcraft (December 4, 1893 – January 26, 1969) was an American painter, art educator, art advocate, and social innovator who significantly contributed to the 20th-century artistic development of Albuquerque, New Mexico, and the greater American Southwest. Born in Hastings, Nebraska, on December 4, 1893, she played a pivotal role in establishing and promoting the arts in Albuquerque.

== Early life and education ==
Dorothea Fricke attended the Art Institute of Chicago in the early 1920s. Due to health reasons, she moved to Albuquerque in 1925 and immediately translated her love for art into action.

In 1928, She founded the Art Department at the University of New Mexico (UNM). She was a key member of the art community and in 1930 she sat for a portrait by Nils Hogner. She served as the head of the Art Department from 1928 to 1936 and launched the UNM Summer Art School at Taos.

Recognizing the need for a city art museum, Dorothea dedicated her life to its establishment. She was a founding member of the New Mexico Art League in 1929 and actively participated in various artistic endeavors, including hosting an annual Beaux-arts costume ball and sponsoring shows, lectures, and performances.

Dorothea married Ellis Ebert Whitcraft, and they had two children, Doretta and Doremus. After Ellis's death in 1938, she returned to Washington DC, traveled to Europe in 1939, and then returned to Albuquerque.

Whitcraft exhibited her work, including "Tail Light," at the Tucson Fine Arts Association Exhibition in 1940 where she was staying with friend and fellow artist Charles Bolsius. She continued to contribute to the art community in Albuquerque, managing the Albuquerque Art Gallery in the 1940s.

In 1959, Whitcraft initiated fundraising for the Museum of Albuquerque through the Art League. In 1961, she led the formation of the Albuquerque Museum Association and played a key role in the establishment of the Museum of Albuquerque in 1968.

== Art ==
Whitcraft was a skilled painter whose geometric abstractions of the desert were early regional examples of abstract expressionism. Her work is included in the collection of the Albuquerque Museum.

== Legacy and recognition ==
Dorothea Whitcraft died on January 26, 1969, at the age of 75, in her home at 817 Rio Grande NW, Albuquerque, Bernalillo County, New Mexico. Her dedication to the arts was posthumously recognized in various ways, including the "Art in Albuquerque, 1880–1941: A Dorothea Whitcraft Memorial" exhibition in May 1969.

In February 1970, the Albuquerque Historical Society established the Dorothea Whitcraft Memorial Fund, dedicated to the purchase of arts and crafts books for the Albuquerque Public Library. The Dorothea Whitcraft Memorial Room was dedicated at the New Mexico Art League in October 1970, and the New Mexico Art League Show building was named the Dorothea Whitcraft Gallery.

Dorothea Whitcraft's contributions continue to be remembered and celebrated in the artistic landscape of Albuquerque.
