= Territorial Revival architecture =

Architectural style

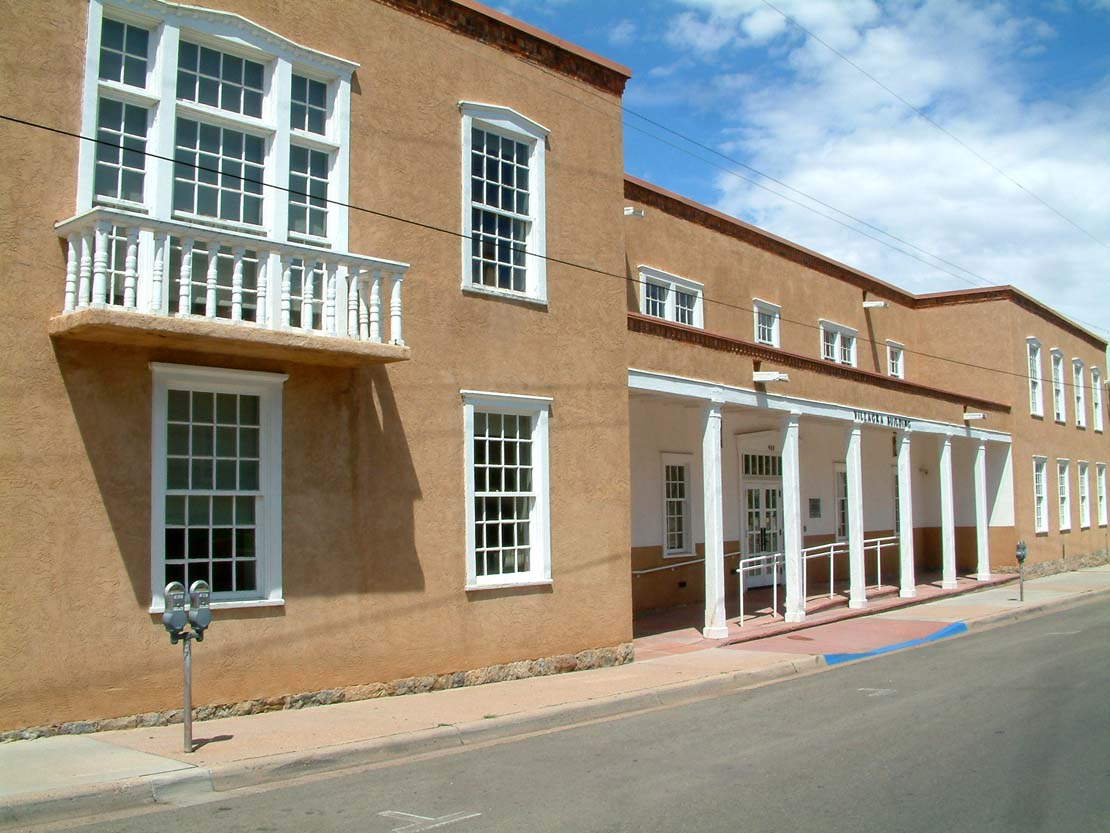
Villagra Building, Santa Fe (1934)

Territorial Revival architecture describes the style of architecture developed in the U.S. state of New Mexico in the 1930s. It derived from New Mexico vernacular Territorial Style, an original style from Santa Fe de Nuevo México following the founding of Albuquerque in 1706. Territorial Revival incorporated elements of traditional Spanish Folk Territorial building techniques with revival style elements. The style was intended to recall the Territorial Style and was extensively employed for New Mexico state government buildings in Santa Fe.

The term Territorial architecture describes a variety of architectural features and regional styles in use during New Spain, Mexico, and American territorial period, from about 1706 until 1912. The revival began during the post-1846 timeframe when Greco-Roman and Gothic elements were being incorporated into the Spanish folk carpentry and Pueblo architecture. The style was encouraged by a State Planning Board proclamation of 1934, which advocated the redesign of the state capitol in "the local Santa Fe type of architecture." Architect John Gaw Meem, a leading proponent of the related Pueblo Revival architectural movement, is considered to be the initiator of Territorial Revival architecture.

== Description and history ==
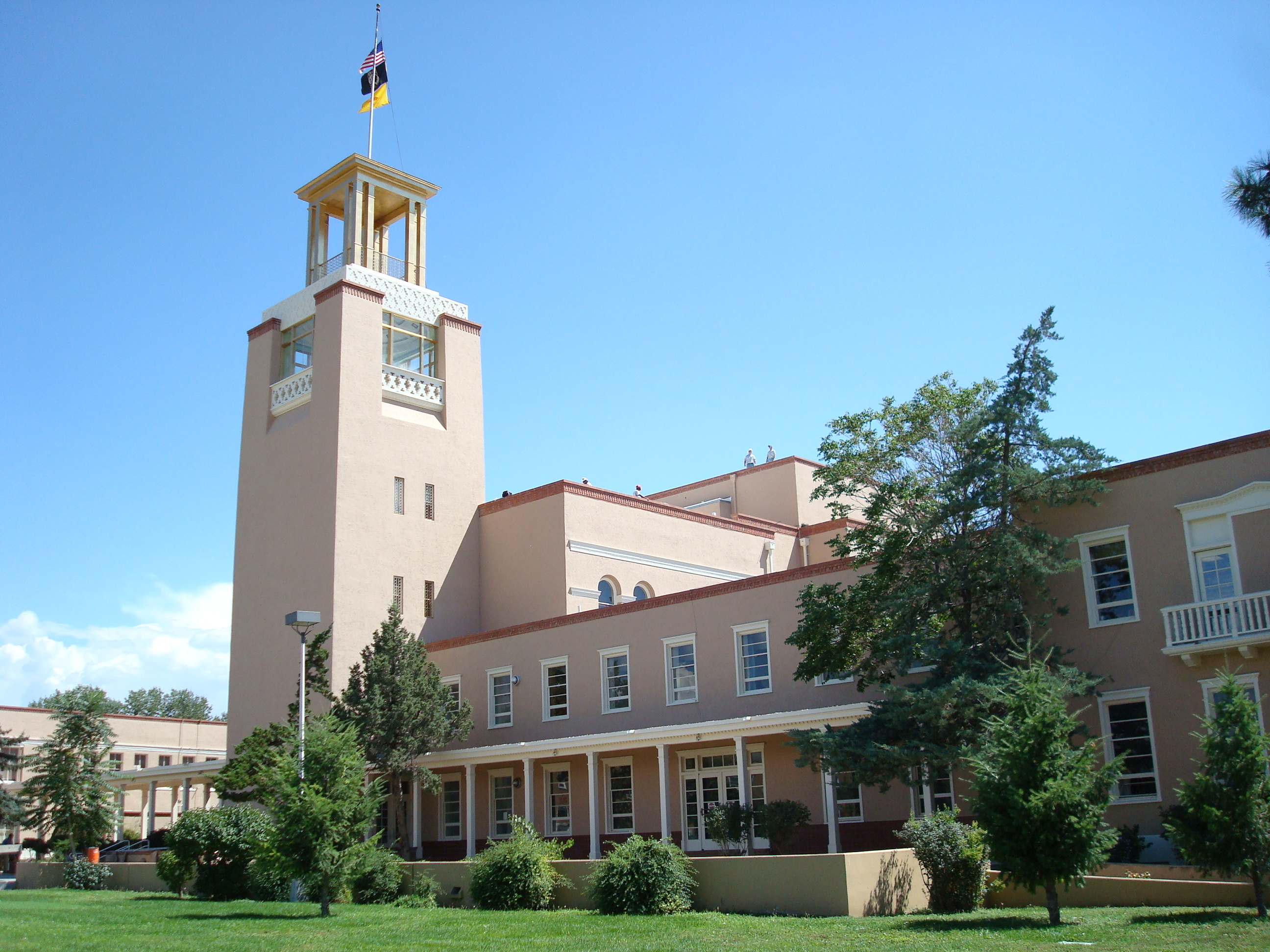
Bataan Memorial Building, Santa Fe

Territorial architecture was defined by the incorporation of elements from classical architecture—pediments, columns copings—into buildings, and the folk carpentry of the Hispanos of New Mexico, and made use of regional architectural elements and materials such as flat roofs, adobe bricks, and wooden porch posts. These were most widely seen in Old Town Albuquerque, which combined the Hispanic and Pueblo style architectural techniques from the surrounding communities of Barelas, Sandia Pueblo, Corrales, Isleta Pueblo, Bernalillo, and Santa Ana Pueblo.

In Territorial Revival architecture, these elements were applied to much larger buildings, such as the New Mexico Capitol Complex, than those that existed during the territorial period. The style was also increasingly adapted to domestic architecture—typically residences of one story—in northern New Mexico, especially in the vicinity of Santa Fe and Albuquerque. Territorial Revival doors and windows sometimes featured lintels with pediments or decorative trim reminiscent of Greek Revival architecture, Gothic Revival architecture, and other classical revival styles. Other distinguishing features of the style are the use of adobe construction, low, flat roofs with a sharp brick edging, white-washed milled lumber columns, and sash windows with mullions.

Territorial Revival was developed in response to the increasing popularity of the Spanish-Pueblo Revival style, with which it shares many features and materials. Architect John Gaw Meem began to design homes in what he referred to as 'territorial' style in response to requests from clients, some of whom desired residences with cleaner, more conventional lines and symmetrical masses than were customary of his Pueblo Revival buildings. Meem's client Mrs. Robert Tilney specifically requested that the architect eschew many of customary Pueblo Revival elements for her 1929 house, saying that she wanted "nothing heavy or Indian", "as little Mexican as possible", and that "the interior of the house be American Colonial in spirit." So Meem took the liberty of blending the Spanish-Pueblo stylings reminiscent of Albuquerque's Old Town, which used the then conventional simpler stylings, into a building technique that simplified the "Indian" and "Mexican" forms into a minimalist style, so as to maintain the regional aesthetic. During the Great Depression of the 1930s, Territorial Revival was sometimes preferred to Pueblo Revival, principally because its relative simplicity and symmetry resulted in lower building costs.

The Territorial Revival style is primarily confined to New Mexico, and continues to be popular into the 21st century, particularly for commercial and government buildings, small offices, residences, and strip malls.

== Examples ==
- New Mexico Capitol Complex, Santa Fe
- Hotel Andaluz, Albuquerque
- Los Poblanos Historic Inn, north of Albuquerque
- Charles Bolsius House, Old Fort Lowell, Tucson, Arizona

== See also ==
- Territorial architecture
- Revivalism (architecture)
- John Gaw Meem
