= Arthur Olaf Andersen =

American classical composer

- Born: 30 January 1880; Newport, Rhode Island
- Died: 11 January 1958 (aged 77)
- Occupations: Songwriter, music theorist, and composer

Arthur Olaf Anderson (30 January 1880 – 11 January 1958) was a songwriter and composer involved in music theory and education. His published works, among many others, include "First Forty Lessons" and "Musical Theory Books I and II", and during his lifetime he composed over 160 choruses and songs, including "Innocence" and "In the silence of night". Known spouses include Mary Storrs Andersen (1880–1946) and Helen Somerville (1892–1968), a fellow composer and pianist. He rests at the Evergreen Memorial Park, Tucson, Arizona.

== Life ==
Andersen graduated from Newport High School in 1896 and went on to study in Boston with Charles Martin Loeffler, in Paris with George Guiraud and Vincent d'Indy, Hermann Durra in Berlin and Giovanni Sgambati in Rome. From 1908 he worked for the Theory Department of the American Conservatory of Music and from 1929 the Chicago Musical College, after which he joined the Music faculty of the University of Arizona as head of the Theory Department and dean of the College of Fine Arts. In 1934 he was awarded the honorary degree of Mus.D. by the American Conservatory of Music in Chicago. Andersen retired in 1951, and died 7 years later.

== Works ==
The full works of Arthur Olaf Andersen are held at the American Music Research Center.
