= Territorial Style =

Style of architecture in Northern New Mexico

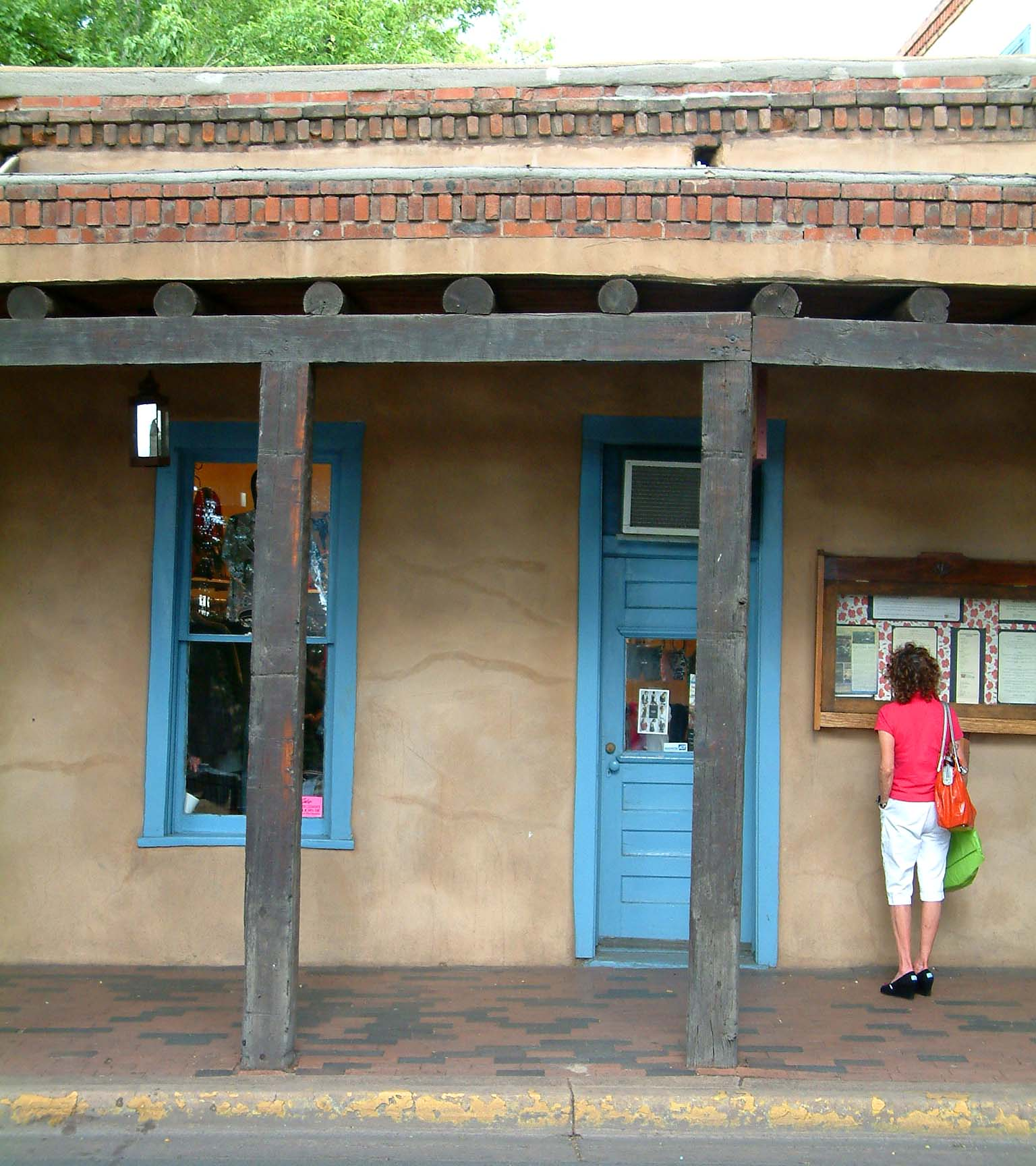
Territorial architecture featured square columns, dentils and window and door trim

Territorial Style was an architectural style of building developed and used in Santa Fe de Nuevo México, popularized after the founding of Albuquerque in 1706. Reintroduced during the New Mexico Territory from the time of the Mexican and American territorial phases in 1821 until 1912, at which time New Mexico stopped being a territory and became a US state. Following the increase of its popularity in the 1930s and 1940s, it became referred to as the Territorial Revival style, which became another popular building style alongside New Mexico's Pueblo Revival style.

== Vernacular ==
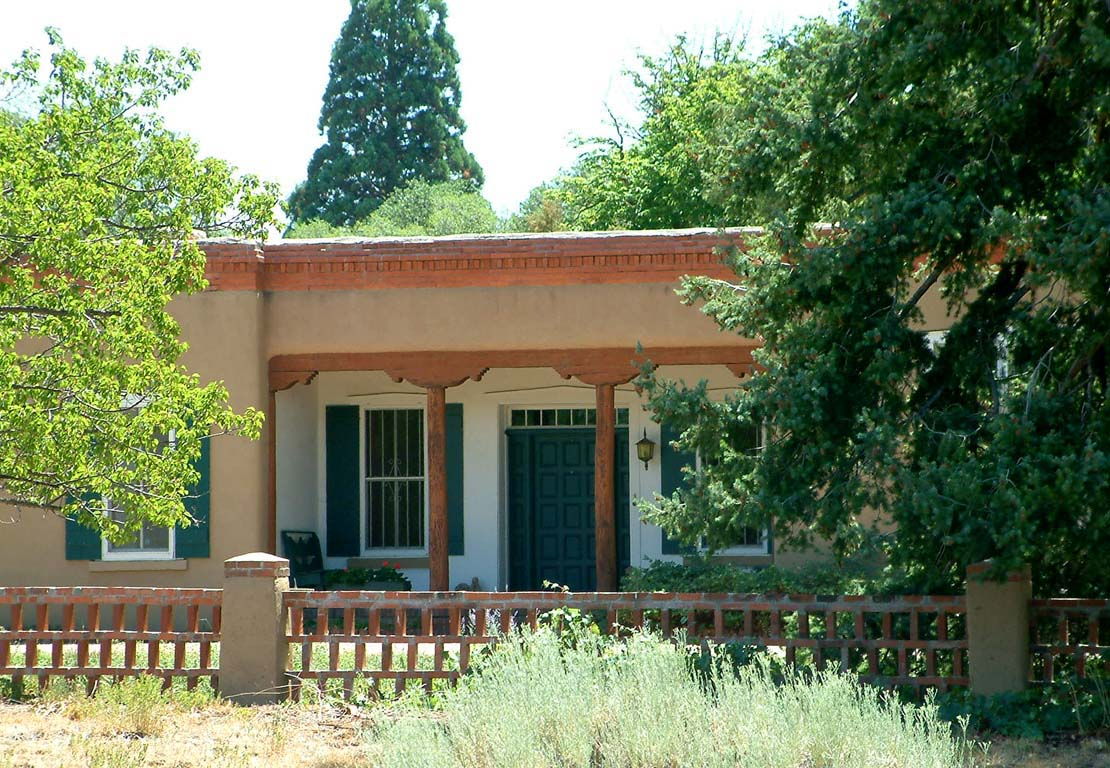
Oldest surviving Territorial house in Santa Fe

A vernacular subgroup, from 1860 to 1935, of the Territorial Style is known as the Folk Territorial, Folk Carpenter, and Spanish Folk Territorial. The style was found "particularly in Northern New Mexico", and consisted of applied wood Greek Revival and Gothic details of the Spanish missions in New Mexico, added to the building styles of the Pueblo architecture the Northern New Mexico adobe building construction style.

== Later development by Anglo-Americans ==
When the Americans, under General Stephen Kearney, arrived in New Mexico in August, 1846 they did not find the fabled and fabulous cities that they had expected. Rather they found a built environment that was totally alien to what they were accustomed. James Bennett, a U.S. dragoon, describes Las Vegas, New Mexico as "a great pile of unbaked brick" adding, "Upon closer inspection everything about the town was dirty and filthy... [with] miserable dirty streets [that] all look alike" while Mora was described by another US soldier, Frank S. Edwards as consisting "of a few mud huts", continuing, "nothing could be more discouraging to me fated to remain a whole year in Mexican territory than the first view of this town." The city of Santa Fe did not inspire any more admiration, "one traveler likened it to 'a dilapidated brick kiln or a prairie dog town."

Soon "increasing numbers of Anglo-Americans began to arrive with new materials and architectural ideas based on those of the communities from which they came. Millwork and brick were imported from St. Louis and Kansas City. The small grilled and glass-less windows began to give way to double hung glazed sashes often provided with slatted shutters on the outside." The Anglos were attempting to create a Greek Revival feel to the vernacular architecture that they found in New Mexico.

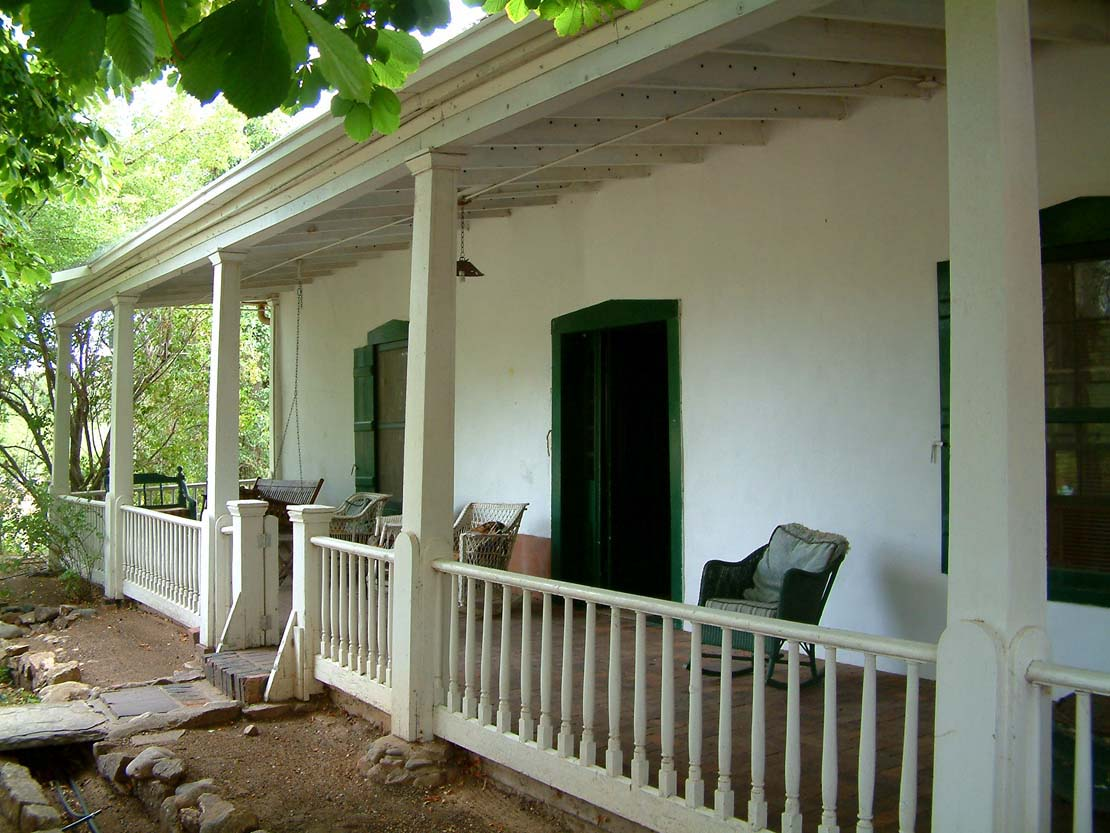
Back porch, Canyon Road, Santa Fe

The Anglos did three things to the adobe architecture. First they added Greek Revival trim to the windows and doors. In some cases shutters were placed by the windows, which were just tacked onto existing structures. Because of the shortage of milled lumber, one of the first things that Kearney did was import the machinery to create a mill. The next step was to start adding brick coping to the tops of adobe walls, thus making the walls substantially more water tight. The cost of importing bricks along the Santa Fe Trail made building entire houses out of brick prohibitively expensive. It was not long before brickyards were established. Frequently, bricklayers laid the bricks in such a way as to produce dentils in the courses.

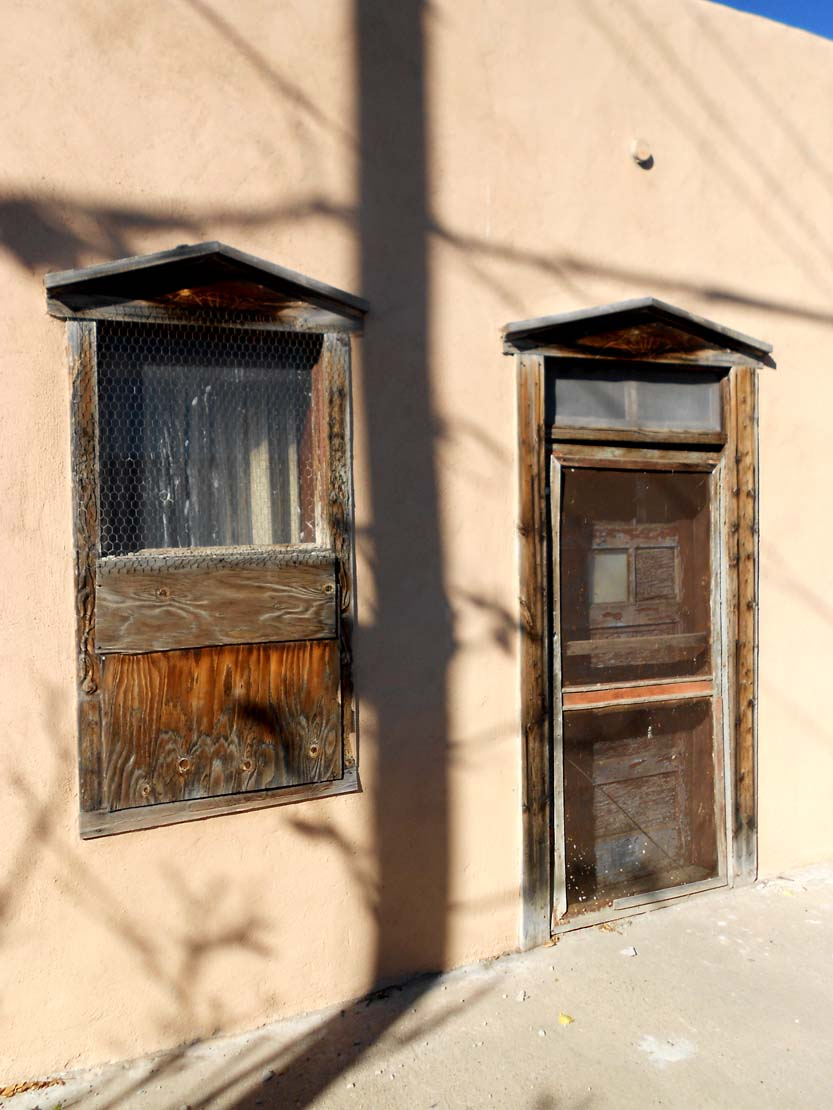
Vernacular or Folk Territorial style house in Española, New Mexico

To further simulate a Greek Revival appearance the Anglos replaced the round tree trunk columns employed by the Hispanic builders with square ones, typically with chamfered corners. Often they were embellished with trim to simulate capitals and bases.

Finally the Anglos introduced the pitched roof and the material to produce them. The ternplate roof was a metal one, made in strips and composed of an alloy of tin and lead. Manufactured in the East, the strips were designed to be soldered together, producing a roof much longer lasting and much less leaky than the flat roofs that were commonly used.

== Reintroduction ==
The style remained in use until 1900. It came back into use in 1930 in the form of Territorial Revival architecture.
