= Las Saetas =

- Post Trader's Store and Riallito House
- U.S. National Register of Historic Places
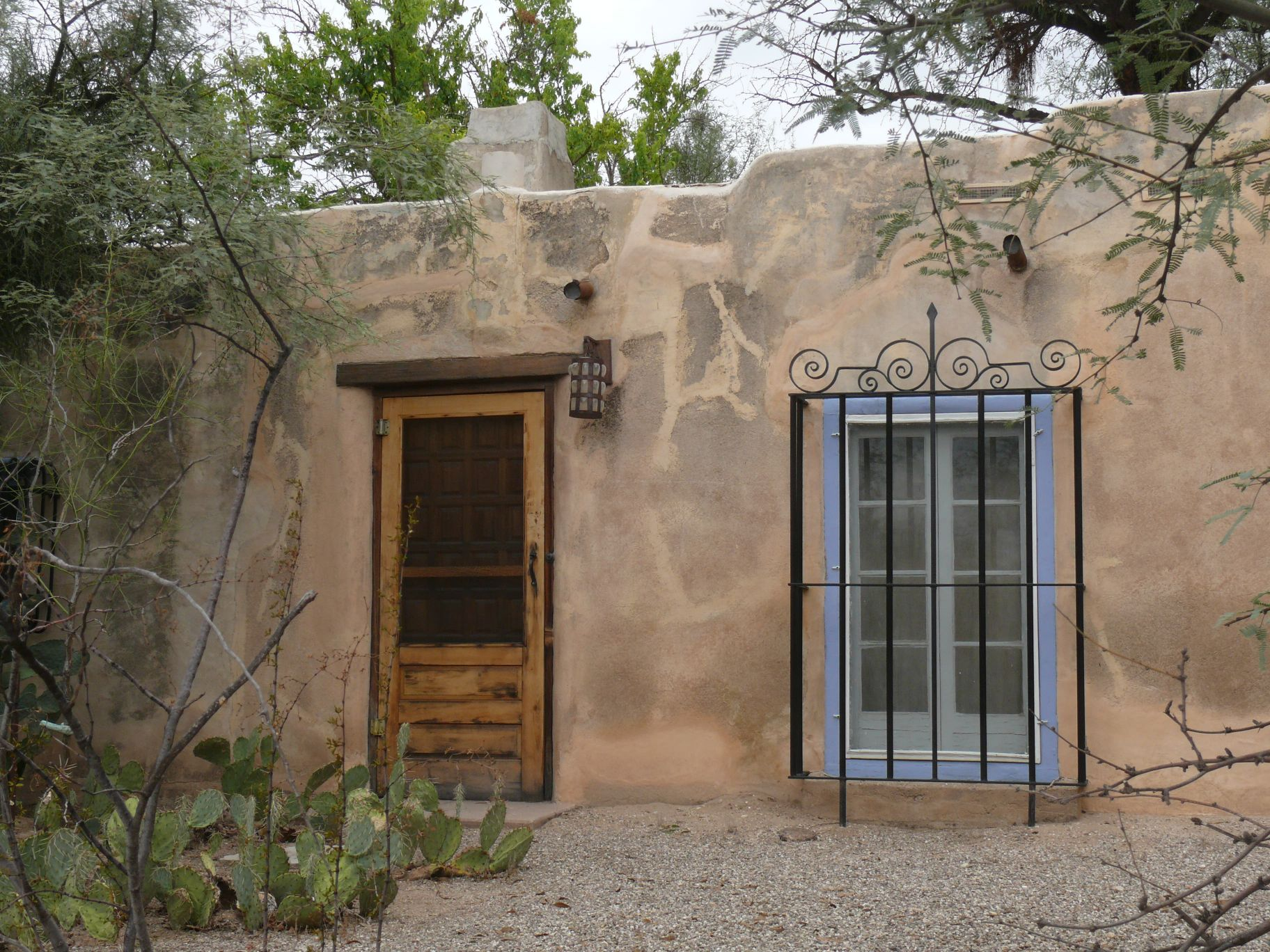
- The building in 2013

- Location within Arizona Location within the United States
- Location: 5425 E. Fort Lowell Rd., Tucson, Arizona
- Coordinates: 32°15′42″N 110°52′38″W
- Area: 1.1 acres (0.45 ha)
- Built: 1873
- Architect: Charles Bolsius (1934 reconstruction)
- Architectural style: Sonoran, Pueblo Revival
- MPS: Fort Lowell MRA
- NRHP reference No.: 78003367
- Added to NRHP: December 13, 1978

Las Saetas is one of the great examples of Pueblo Revival architecture in the American Southwest. Rebuilt in 1935 from the ruins of the 1873 Post Traders Store the design-build project was led by Dutch-born artist Charles Bolsius, with Nan and Pete Bolsius. The project included hand-carved doors, exposed beams, carved corbels, adobe fireplaces, hand-hammered tin, and a heightened sense of romanticism. The property and its transformation over a 150-year-span reflect the changing culture and economic milieu of Southern Arizona and the American West.

Las Saetas was originally built as the Fort Lowell Post Traders Store in 1870 from unstabilized mud adobe in a territorial style. The building served as a store, saloon, and gambling hall. After the closure and decommissioning of the Fort, the property had successive owners and uses including a farm headquarters and tuberculous sanatorium - health ranch before falling to ruin. The rambling property was purchased by the Bolsius Family in 1934. Nan and Pete Bolsius and Artist Charles Bolsius reimagined the property as a Pueblo Revival hacienda and hand reconfigured and reconstructed the building. Las Saetas is located in the Fort Lowell Historic District in east-central Tucson, Arizona.

== History ==
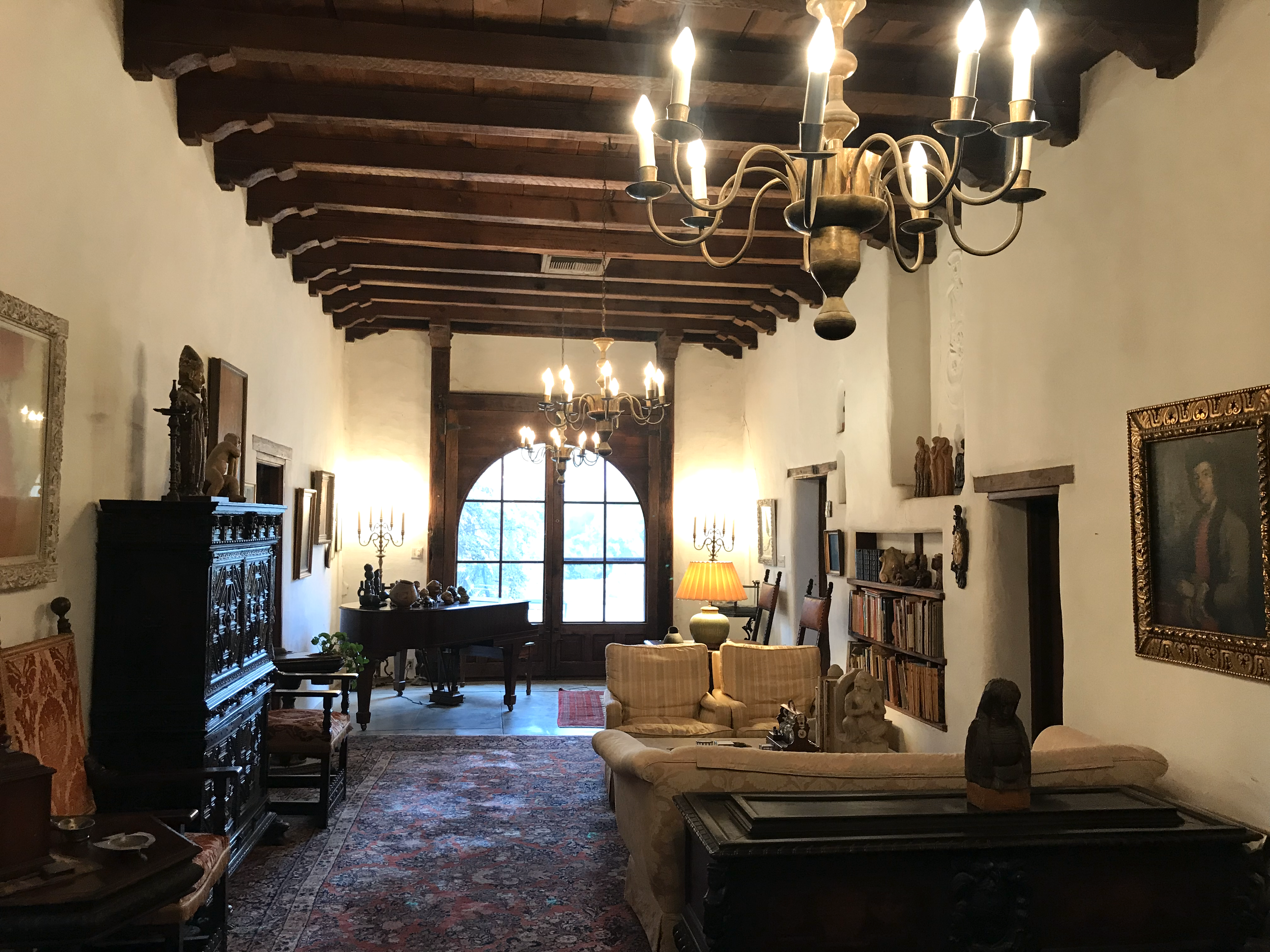
Las Saetas, Interior, Fort Lowell, Tucson, Arizona

Las Saetas, was originally built by Post-Trader, Gen. John B. “Pie” Allen at the entrance to the new Camp Lowell, six and a half miles northeast of Tucson in 1873. The rambling large sun-dried mud adobe complex was constructed as the installation's Post-Trader's Store or Sutler's Store to supply general merchandise to the officers and enlisted men stationed at the camp. The building was demised into two uses: public rooms to the east and the post trader's private residence, store rooms, and corrals to the west. The two zones were separated by a large arched open breezeway that extended through the building from north to south. At the time of construction, the building looked north across the fertile desert floodplain, over the dense green bosque hugging the banks of the Rillito River to the expansive views of the Santa Catalina Mountain Range.

The south facade of Las Saetas is the principal public view of the property. The facade is characterized by large irregular geometric massing of mud adobe walls rendered in lime plaster. The 1873 building was originally an exposed adobe structure with a flat roof and parapet. The simple territorial design featured a front portál (veranda/porch) with a wood shingle roof and mill-sawn posts that extended along the eastern half of the facade and wrapped the building to the east. Elongated metal canales funneled water off the roof across the veranda. The facade had minimal ornamental detailing but included carved decorative cross beams on the veranda. The windows were trimmed in wood and included the territorial style triangular-shaped pedimented lintel, featuring either a plain fascia or one augmented by combinations of moldings. The primary entryway to the building was an open arched zaguán which served as a central entry hall / breezeway which connected to the large public rooms. West of this program were private living quarters and service, storage, and farm rooms.

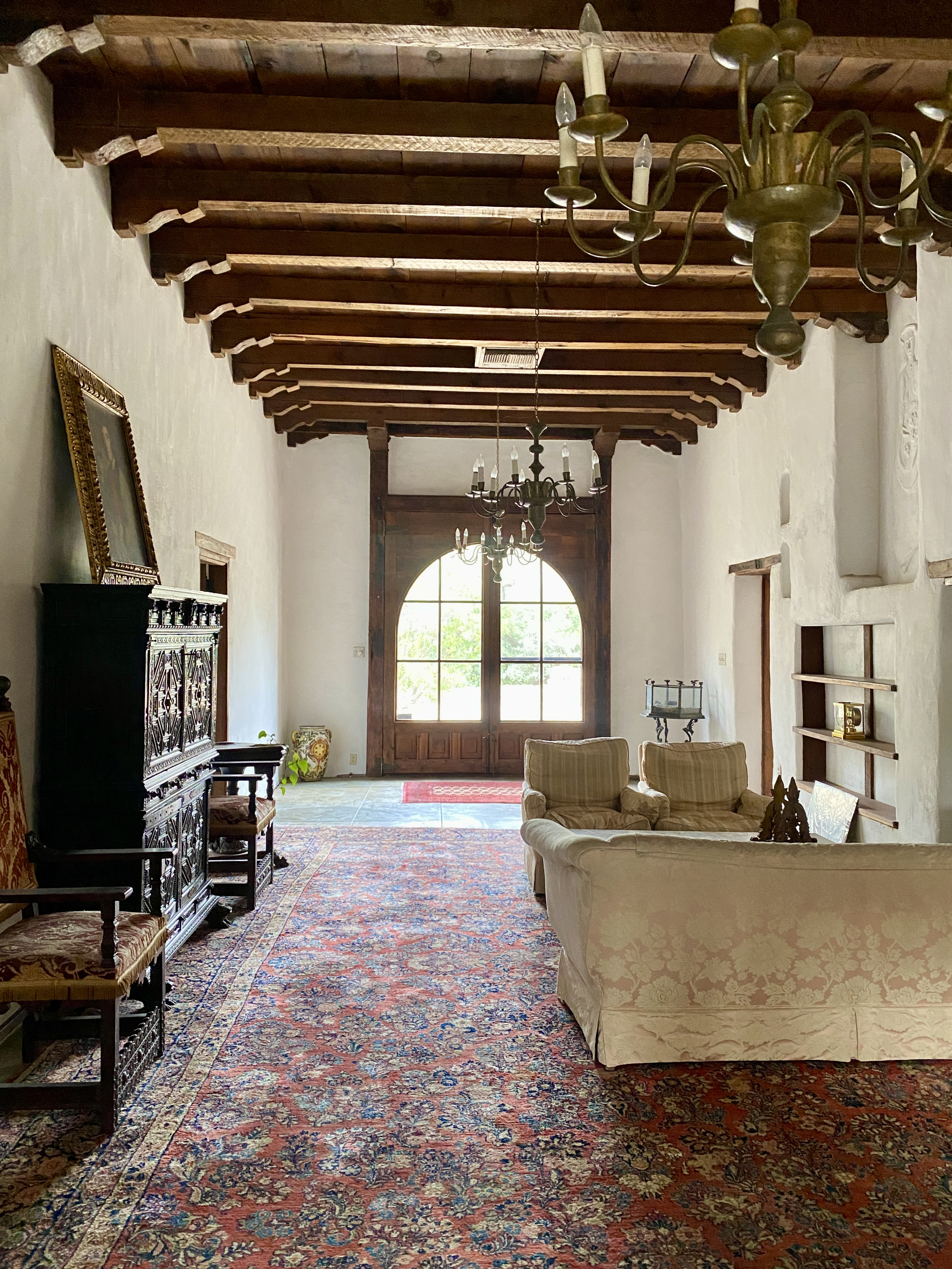
Las Saetas, Old Fort Lowell, Tucson, Arizona, Zaguan

By the 1930s the building had been stuccoed in lime plaster. When the building was reconstructed in the mid-1930s, the Bolsius trio used the adobe shell which lent itself to the Pueblo Revival idiom. Having spent time in New Mexico they took inspiration from the romanticized architectural traditions of the southwest and infused a high artistic style into the project which elevated it into an extraordinary example of regional design. As part of the transformation, they continued the lime plaster stucco treatment which softened and rounded edges and installed beautifully hand-carved wood doors, hand-carved corbels, vigas, and lintels. They used the extant territorial windows painted blue and enclosed the zaguán into a sala (living room). As part of the reconstruction, they used numerous conventions typical of Spanish colonial and pueblo revival architecture in the Southwest including adding alacena (cupboards built into an interior adobe wall), bancos (adobe benches built at the base of a wall), nichos (niche in interior adobe wall used for display of santos and artworks) and redesigned and installed fogon (comer fireplaces). As part of the redesign they retained the original south facade volume and basic detailing including the retention of the south-facing portion of original portál. A wall was added connecting the main house with the gatehouse punctuated by a decorative carved gate topped with an espadana and bell.

The Bolsius used the house to host cultural events, programs, art exhibits and served as the locus of the Fort Lowell art colony.

Las Saetas was designated a contributing property to the Pima County Fort Lowell Historic District in 1976 and was individually listed in the National Register of Historic Places under the Fort Lowell Multi-Cultural District in April 1978. The property is today included in the City of Tucson Fort Lowell Historic Preservation Zone, designated in 1981.

== Ownership ==
In 1974, the house was purchased from Pete Bolsius by New Yorkers Peggy and Ben Sackheim. They undertook a major renovation of the property which included additions and alterations. The major changes included the enclosure of the portál into an entrada and galleria, the addition of a master bathroom on the northeast corner of the house, the addition of the dining room, which more substantially connected the west wing to the main house, the enlargement of the west wing rooms to the north, and the addition of a three-bay carport behind the connecting wall and original gate open towards the gatehouse. On the interior, they removed the living room fireplace and banco and added lofts to two rooms. The changes maintained the pueblo revival character.

In June 2022, Josie and Douglas G. Smith, founders of Korakia and Sparrows Lodge in Palm Springs, California, purchased the property, where they undertook numerous deleterious alterations. The Smiths removed the heirloom cactus gardens, cut down protected saguaro cacti, and were cited by the City of Tucson for conducting construction work without the necessary permits. Ultimately, they sold the property at a financial loss in 2023 to Nancy and Thomas Allin who have made further modifications.
