= Pueblo Revival architecture =

Architectural movement

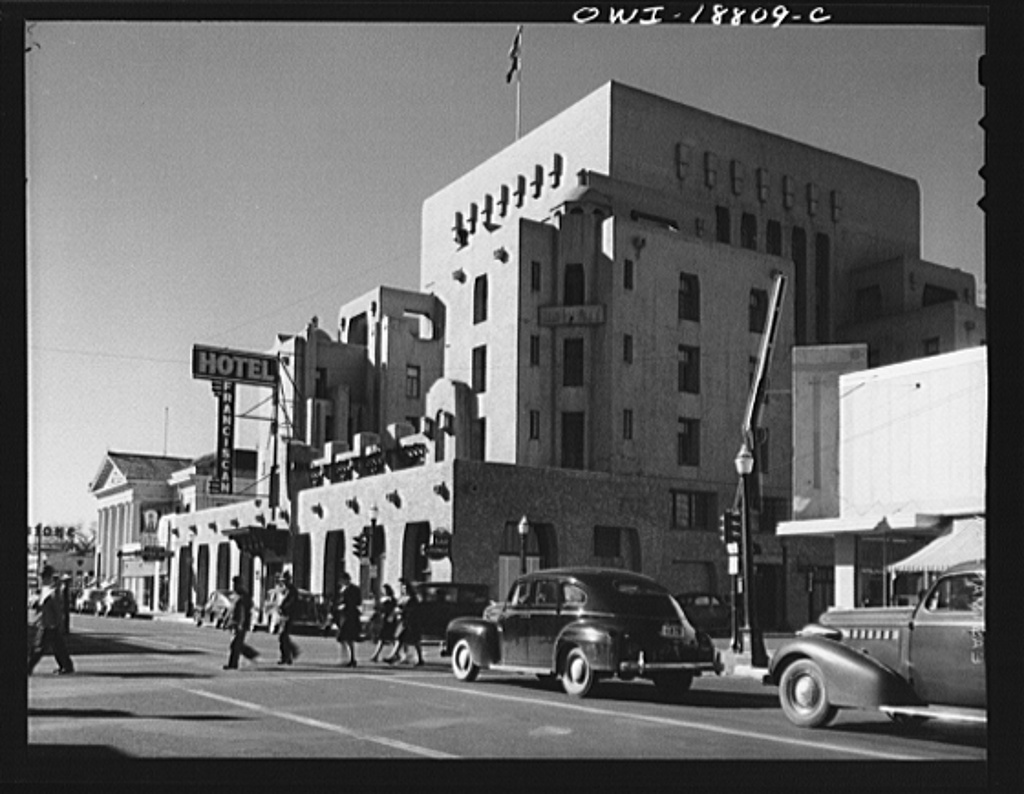
Hotel Franciscan in Albuquerque, 1943

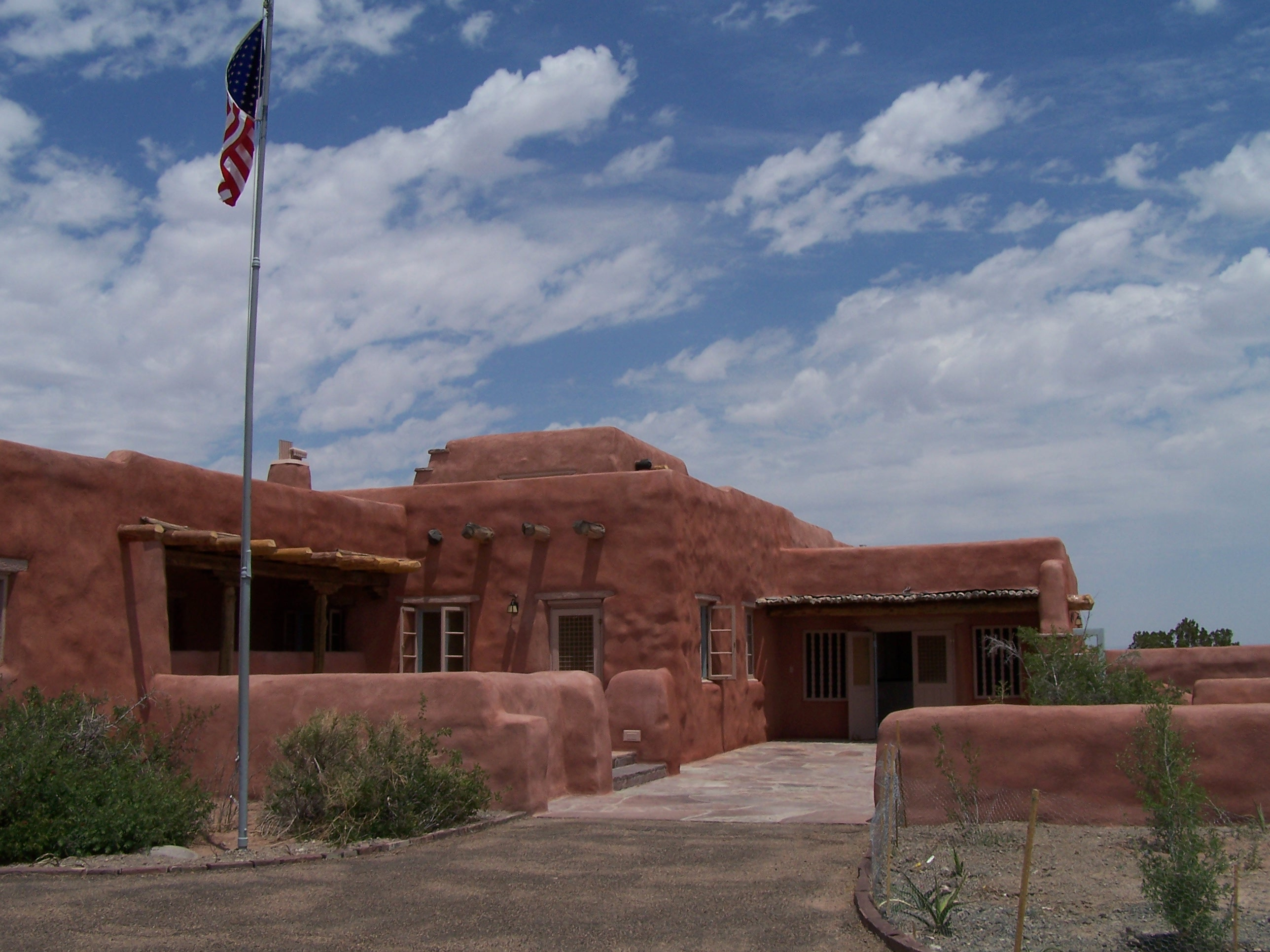
Painted Desert Inn, a National Historic Landmark in Arizona

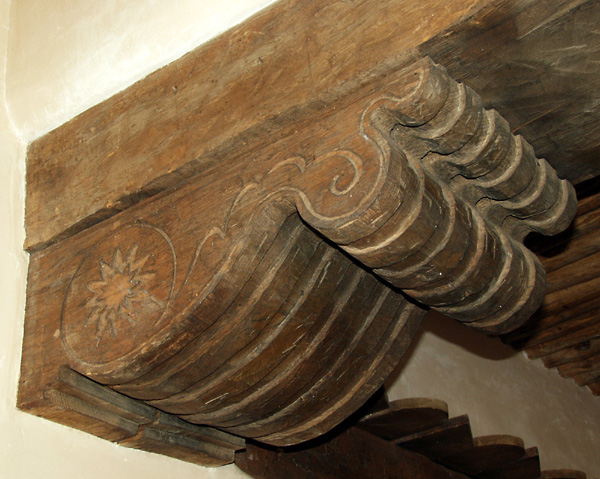
Pueblo Revival corbel, hand-carved from ponderosa pine, at the Bandelier National Monument Visitor Center

The Pueblo Revival style or Santa Fe style is a regional architectural style of the Southwestern United States, which draws its inspiration from Santa Fe de Nuevo México's traditional Pueblo architecture, the Spanish missions, and Territorial Style. The style developed at the beginning of the 20th century and reached its greatest popularity in the 1920s and 1930s, though it is still commonly used for new buildings. Pueblo traditional architecture is most prevalent in the state of New Mexico; it is often blended with Territorial Revival architecture.

== Features ==
Pueblo Revival architecture imitates the appearance of traditional adobe Pueblo architecture, though other materials such as brick or concrete are often substituted. If adobe is not used, rounded corners, irregular parapets, and thick, battered walls are used to simulate it. Walls are usually stuccoed and painted in earth tones. Multistory buildings usually employ stepped massing similar to that seen at Taos Pueblo. Roofs are always flat. Common features of the Pueblo Revival style include projecting wooden roof beams or vigas, which sometimes serve no structural purpose, "corbels", curved—often stylized—beam supports and latillas, which are peeled branches or strips of wood laid across the tops of vigas to create a foundation (usually supporting dirt or clay) for a roof.

== History ==
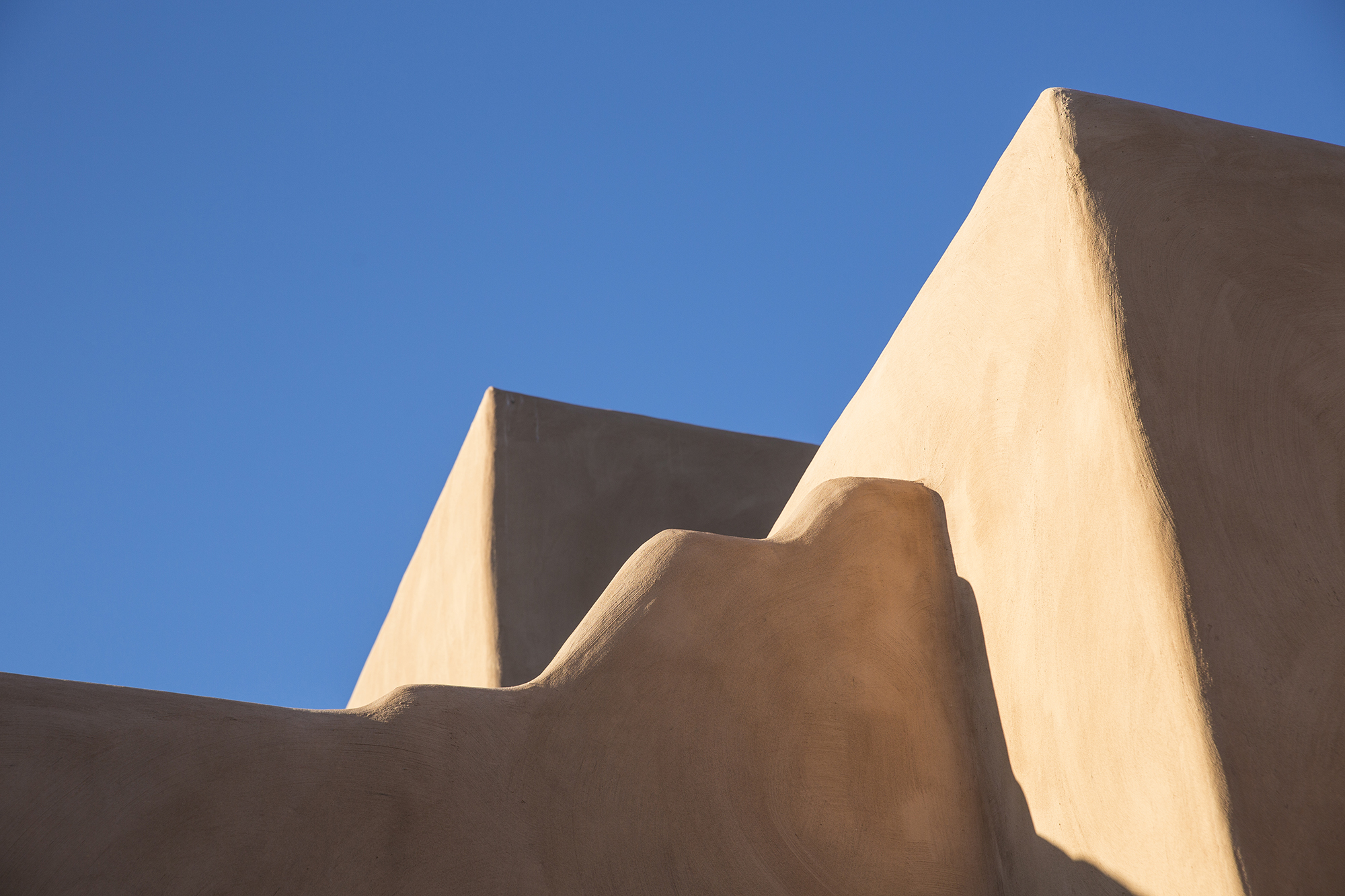
detail of adobe architecture, La Fonda, Santa Fe, NM

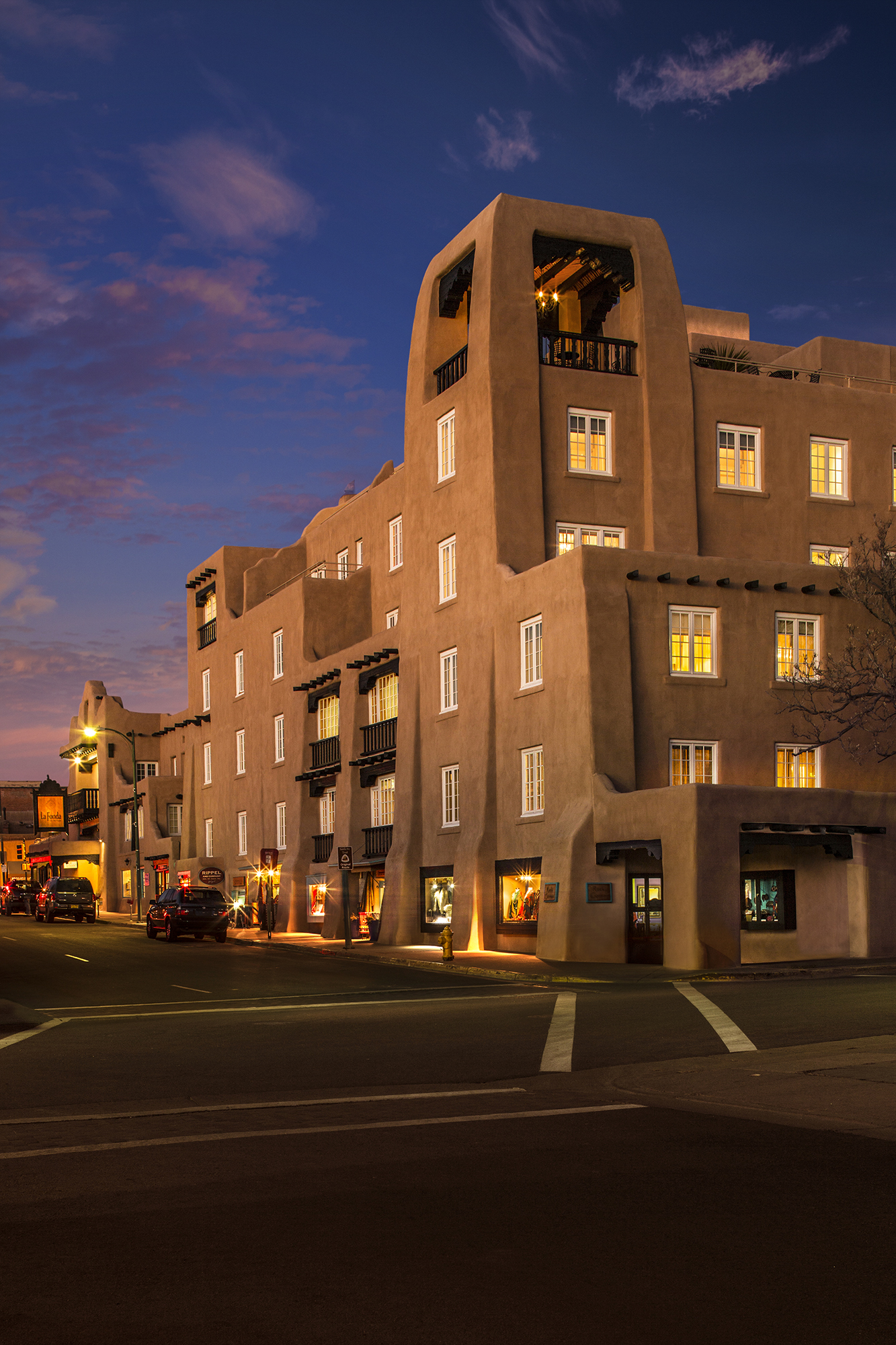
View of the La Fonda hotel from the southwest, built in 1922 and remodeled in 1929

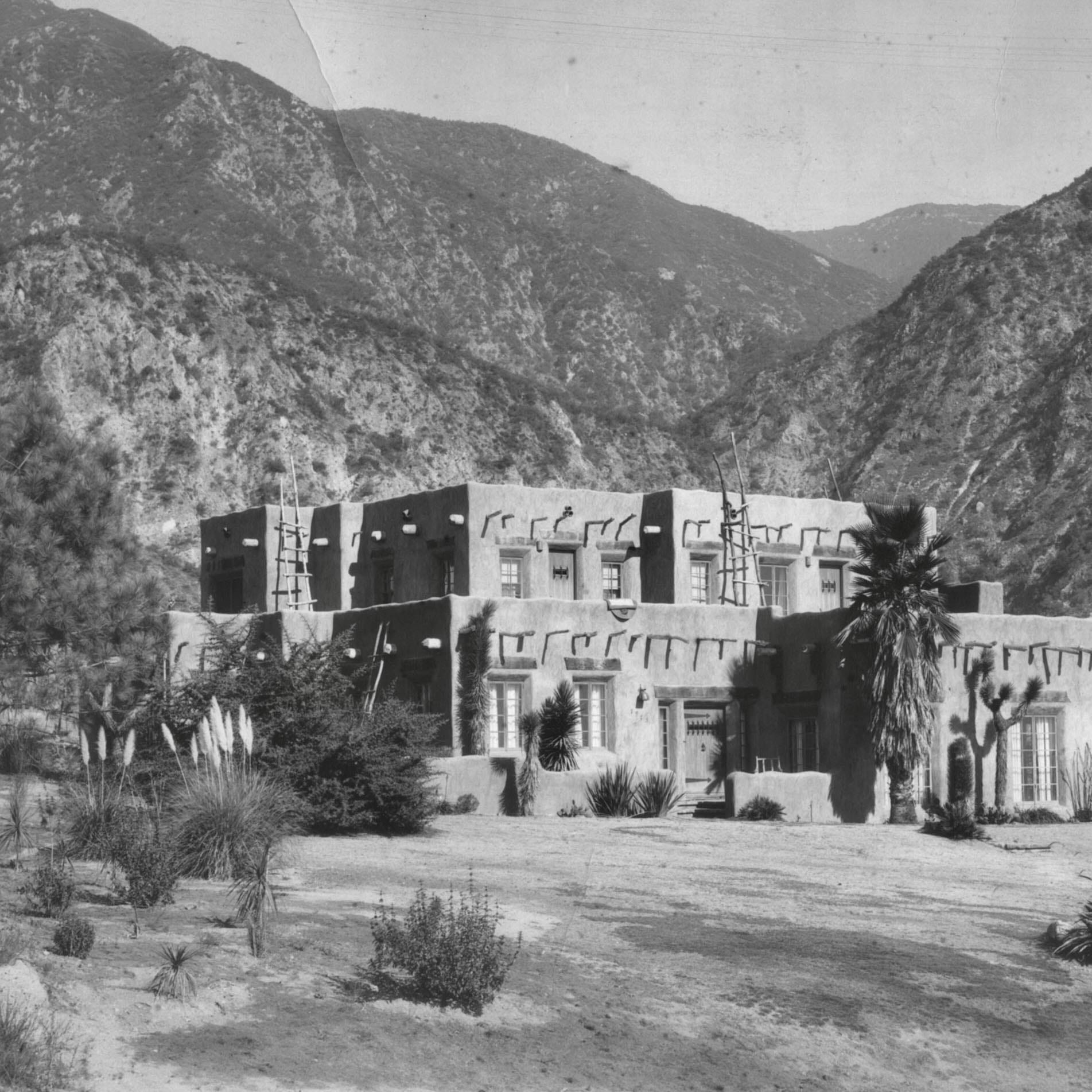
Pueblo House at 2167 Crescent Drive, Altadena - 1923.

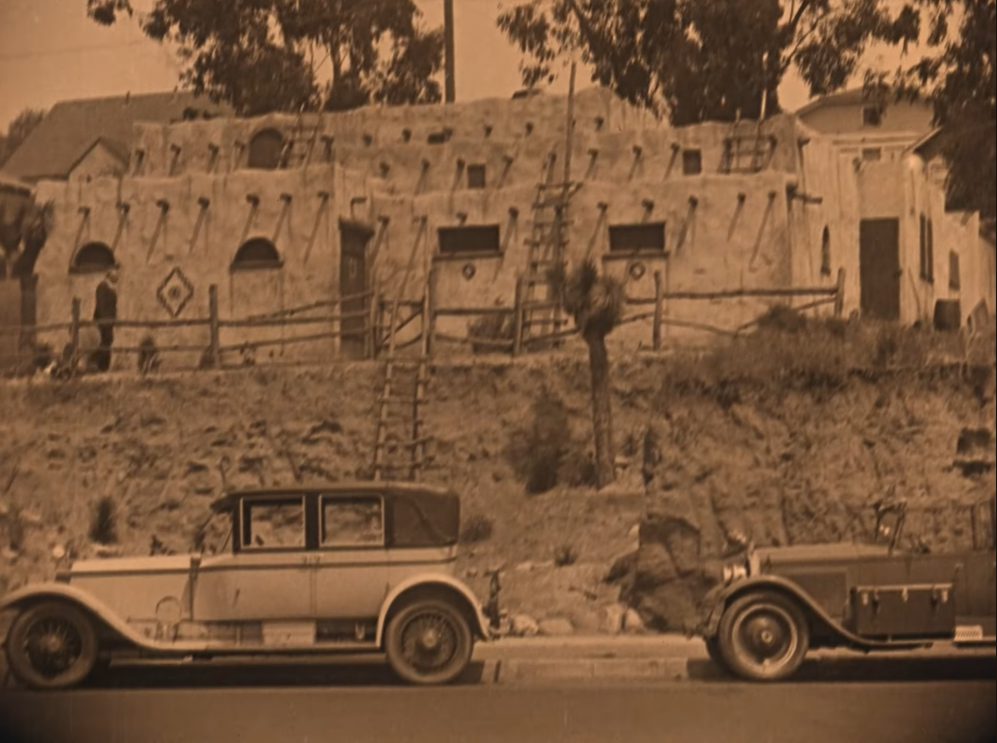
Pueblo revival cottages, Hollywood - early 1920s.

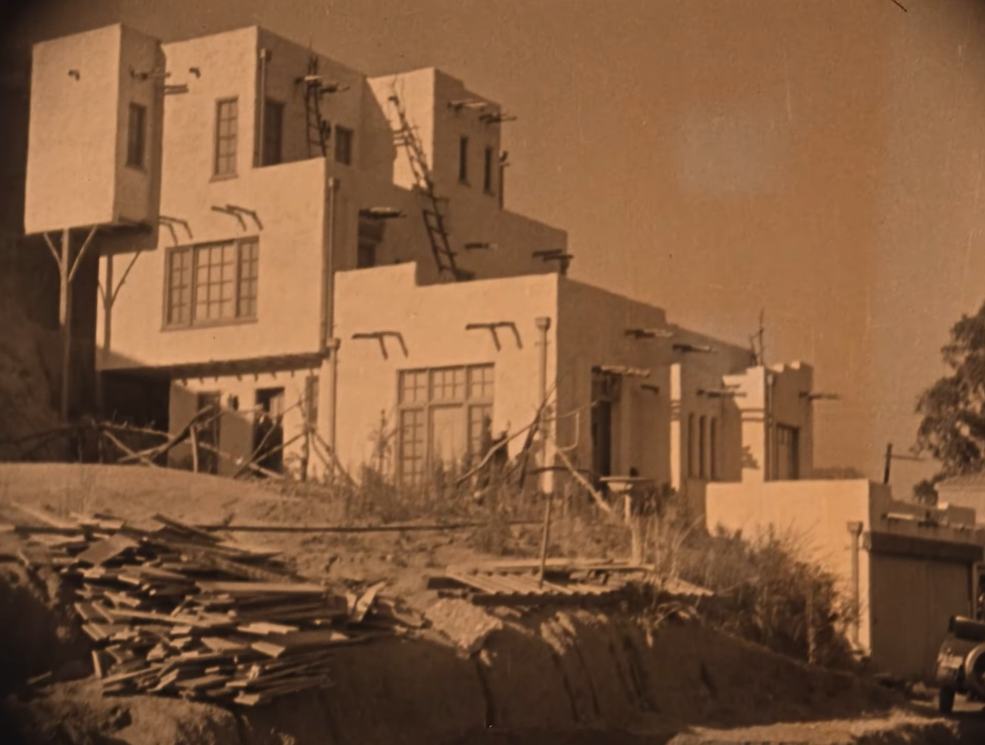
Another Pueblo revival construction in the 1920s Hollywood.

The regional architecture from which the Pueblo style draws its inspiration is primarily found in New Mexico and Arizona, but also Colorado. Although the revival movement is most closely associated with the state of New Mexico, many early examples were built in other western states. In the 1890s, architect A. C. Schweinfurth incorporated Pueblo features into a number of his buildings in California. Mary Colter's Hopi House (1904) in Grand Canyon National Park drew heavily on the Pueblo style. In 1908, architect Isaac Rapp used the San Estevan Del Rey Mission Church as a template for his Colorado Supply Company warehouse in Morley, Colorado.

The Pueblo Revival style made its first appearance in New Mexico at the University of New Mexico in Albuquerque, where UNM president William G. Tight adopted the style for a number of building projects during his tenure. The best known of these was the 1908 remodeling of Hodgin Hall, which survives as well as the slightly earlier Estufa, both designed by architect Edward Buxton Cristy under Tight's supervision. Other pioneering buildings that no longer exist were a heating plant and two of the university's dormitories, Hokona Hall and Kwataka Hall, also designed by Cristy and built in 1906. Nearly all subsequent university buildings have also employed the Pueblo style, albeit in increasingly loose interpretations.

The other stronghold of Pueblo-style architecture is Santa Fe, where it was popularized in the 1920s and 1930s by a group of artists and architects seeking to establish a unique regional identity. In 1957, a committee led by John Gaw Meem drafted Santa Fe "H" Historical District Regulations Ordinance No. 1957-18, commonly known as the Historical Zoning Ordinance. This ordinance mandated the use of the "Old Santa Fe Style," which encompassed "so-called Pueblo, Pueblo-Spanish or Spanish-Indian and Territorial styles," on all new buildings in central Santa Fe. This ordinance remains in effect, meaning the Pueblo style continues to predominate.

Pueblo-style houses are still frequently constructed in Albuquerque, Santa Fe, and elsewhere. Updated versions of the style have also been used for newer commercial and public buildings such as the Albuquerque International Sunport terminal (1966) and the newer UNM buildings.

== Notable buildings ==
- Heating plant, Hokona Hall and Kwataka Hall at University of New Mexico in Albuquerque, New Mexico (architect Edward Buxton Cristy, 1906; demolished between the 1950s and the 1970s)
- Estufa at University of New Mexico in Albuquerque (architect E. B. Cristy, 1906)
- Remodeling of Hodgin Hall at University of New Mexico in Albuquerque (architect E. B. Cristy, 1908)
- New Mexico Museum of Art in Santa Fe, New Mexico (architect Isaac Rapp, 1917)
- Federal building in Santa Fe, now Museum of Contemporary Native Arts of the Institute of American Indian Arts (architect Louis A. Simon, 1920–1922)
- La Fonda Hotel in Santa Fe (architect Isaac Rapp, 1922; remodeled 1929, architect John Gaw Meem)
- Hotel Franciscan in Albuquerque (architect Henry Trost, 1920–1923; demolished in 1972)
- Glenn Curtiss Mansion in Miami Springs, Florida (architect Martin L. Hampton, 1925)
- Taylor Memorial Chapel in Black Forest, Colorado (architect John Gaw Meem, 1929)
- Visitor Center, Bandelier National Monument in New Mexico (architect Lyle E. Bennett, 1934–1941)
- Visitor Center, White Sands National Park near Alamogordo, New Mexico (architect Lyle E. Bennett, 1936–1938)
- Zimmerman Library at University of New Mexico in Albuquerque (architect John Gaw Meem, 1938)
- El Cuartel Viejo, Old Fort Lowell, Tucson, Arizona, Charles Bolsius architectural designer and builder, 1942 - 1949
- Painted Desert Inn in Petrified Forest National Park, Arizona (architect Lyle E. Bennett, 1937–1940; remodeled by Mary Colter in 1947)
- Cristo Rey Church in Santa Fe (architect John Gaw Meem, 1939–1940)
- Cabot's Pueblo Museum in Desert Hot Springs, California (self-built by Cabot Abram Yerxa, 1921–1945)
- The Inn and Spa at Loretto in Santa Fe (architect Herald Stewart, 1975)
- The Eldorado Hotel in Santa Fe (Lloyd & Associates Architects, 1985)
- Las Saetas, Old Fort Lowell, Tucson, Arizona, Charles Bolsius architectural designer and builder, 1934 - 1940

== See also ==
- Mission Revival architecture
- Spanish Colonial Revival architecture
- Territorial Revival architecture
- Pueblo Deco architecture

== Notes ==
1. Whiffen (1969), pp. 229–233
2. Whiffen (1969), pp. 229–233
3. Hooker (2000)
4. Harris (1997), pp. 3–6
