= National Register of Historic Places listings in Doña Ana County, New Mexico =

Location of Doña Ana County in New Mexico

This is intended to be a complete list of the properties and districts on the National Register of Historic Places in Doña Ana County, New Mexico, United States. Latitude and longitude coordinates are provided for many National Register properties and districts; these locations may be seen together in a map.

There are 34 properties and districts listed on the National Register in the county, including 2 National Historic Landmarks. All of the places within the county on the National Register are also listed on the State Register of Cultural Properties.

This National Park Service list is complete through NPS recent listings posted May 1, 2026.

Contents: NRHP in New Mexico by county
Bernalillo – Catron – Chaves – Cibola – Colfax – Curry – De Baca – Doña Ana – Eddy – Grant – Guadalupe – Harding – Hidalgo – Lea – Lincoln – Los Alamos – Luna – McKinley – Mora – Otero – Quay – Rio Arriba – Roosevelt – San Juan – San Miguel – Sandoval – Santa Fe – Sierra – Socorro – Taos – Torrance – Union – Valencia

== Current listings ==
	Name on the Register	Image	Date listed	Location	City or town	Description
1	Air Science	Air Science	May 16, 1989 (#88001546)	Northeastern corner of N. Horseshoe and Espina St. on the New Mexico State University campus 32°17′00″N 106°45′19″W	Las Cruces	Today the William Conroy Honors Center
2	Alameda-Depot Historic District	Alameda-Depot Historic District	April 11, 1985 (#85000786)	Includes properties centered around Pioneer Park and extending up Alameda Boulevard; 32°18′45″N 106°47′01″W	Las Cruces	
3	Nestor Armijo House	Nestor Armijo House	December 12, 1976 (#76001195)	Lohman Ave. and Church St. 32°18′20″N 106°46′35″W	Las Cruces	
4	Barela-Reynolds House	Barela-Reynolds House	January 20, 1978 (#78001815)	Off State Road 292; 32°16′27″N 106°47′43″W	Mesilla	State Historic Site
5	L.B. Bentley General Merchandise	L.B. Bentley General Merchandise	March 22, 2006 (#06000155)	16125 Old Organ Main St. 32°25′40″N 106°35′55″W	Organ	
6	Thomas Branigan Memorial Library	Thomas Branigan Memorial Library	September 15, 2004 (#04000981)	106 W. Hadley St. 32°18′52″N 106°46′48″W	Las Cruces	Original library building; replaced by newer facility in 1979
7	Camino Real-Rincon Arroyo-Perrillo Section		April 8, 2011 (#11000172)	Address Restricted	Rincon	
8	Camino Real-San Diego South		April 8, 2011 (#11000165)	Address Restricted	Rincon	
9	Camino Real-San Diego North South Section		April 8, 2011 (#11000166)	Address Restricted	Radium Springs	
10	Chope's Town Cafe and Bar	Chope's Town Cafe and Bar	May 26, 2015 (#15000262)	16145 NM 28; 32°07′10″N 106°42′22″W	La Mesa	
11	Doña Ana Village Historic District		September 27, 1996 (#96001042)	Roughly bounded by the Doña Ana lateral irrigation ditch, Interstate 25, State Road 320, and Doña Ana School Rd. 32°23′17″N 106°48′56″W	Doña Ana	
12	Paul Laurence Dunbar Elementary School	Paul Laurence Dunbar Elementary School	February 7, 2017 (#100000630)	325 Holguin Rd. 32°07′06″N 106°39′46″W	Vado	
13	Elephant Butte Irrigation District		August 8, 1997 (#97000822)	Roughly along U.S. Route 85 between its junction with State Road 90 and the El Paso city limits 32°12′58″N 106°57′31″W	Las Cruces	Extends into Sierra County and El Paso County, Texas
14	Fort Fillmore		July 30, 1974 (#74001196)	Eastern side of Holy Cross Rd., southeast of Las Cruces; 32°15′28″N 106°44′36″W	Las Cruces	
15	Fort Selden	Fort Selden	July 9, 1970 (#70000401)	18 miles north of Las Cruces; 32°29′45″N 106°55′30″W	Radium Springs	State Historic Site
16	Foster Hall	Foster Hall	May 16, 1989 (#88001547)	Southeastern corner of the junction of S. Horseshoe and Sweet on the New Mexico State University campus 32°16′53″N 106°45′09″W	Las Cruces	
17	Goddard Hall	Goddard Hall	September 22, 1988 (#88001548)	S. Horseshoe between Espina and Sweet on the New Mexico State University campus 32°16′53″N 106°45′13″W	Las Cruces	
18	Green Bridge	Green Bridge	August 21, 2008 (#08000791)	4100 Dripping Springs Rd. 32°17′56″N 106°43′13″W	Las Cruces	
19	Hadley-Ludwick House	Hadley-Ludwick House	April 3, 1991 (#91000352)	2640 El Paseo; 32°16′59″N 106°45′42″W	Las Cruces	
20	International Boundary Marker No. 1, U.S. and Mexico	International Boundary Marker No. 1, U.S. and Mexico	September 10, 1974 (#74001195)	West of El Paso off Interstate 10; 31°47′02″N 106°31′47″W	Sunland Park	Border monument placed in 1855
21	Frank and Amelia Jones House	Frank and Amelia Jones House	July 25, 2014 (#14000444)	18000 Castillo Rd. 32°08′42″N 106°43′02″W	La Mesa	
22	La Mesilla Historic District	La Mesilla Historic District	July 20, 1982 (#82003323)	Roughly bounded by Calle del Norte, Calle del El Paso, Calle del Cura and Calleion Guerro; 32°16′49″N 106°47′39″W	Mesilla	
23	Launch Complex 33	Launch Complex 33	October 3, 1985 (#85003541)	White Sands Missile Range; 32°24′04″N 106°22′40″W	White Sands Missile Range	
24	Mesilla Park Elementary School	Mesilla Park Elementary School	February 23, 2015 (#15000039)	304 Bell Ave. 32°16′30″N 106°46′10″W	Las Cruces	
25	Mesilla Park Historic District		April 12, 2016 (#16000161)	Bounded by Bowman St., Union and University Aves., and Park Drain; 32°16′38″N 106°46′08″W	Las Cruces	
26	Mesilla Plaza	Mesilla Plaza	October 15, 1966 (#66000475)	2 miles south of Las Cruces on State Road 28; 32°16′25″N 106°48′16″W	Mesilla	
27	Mesquite Street Original Townsite Historic District	Mesquite Street Original Townsite Historic District	August 1, 1985 (#85001669)	Roughly bounded by E. Texas, Campo, Tornillo, and E. Court; 32°18′31″N 106°46′26″W	Las Cruces	
28	Our Lady of Purification Catholic Church	Our Lady of Purification Catholic Church	June 27, 1985 (#85001386)	Camino Real and 2nd St. 32°23′14″N 106°48′59″W	Doña Ana	
29	Phillips Chapel CME Church	Phillips Chapel CME Church	August 4, 2003 (#03000735)	638 N. Tornillo St. 32°18′54″N 106°46′25″W	Las Cruces	
30	Rio Grande Bridge at Radium Springs	Rio Grande Bridge at Radium Springs	July 15, 1997 (#97000734)	State Road 185 over the Rio Grande; 32°29′11″N 106°55′31″W	Radium Springs	Timber beam bridge built in 1933.
31	Rio Grande Theatre	Rio Grande Theatre	January 2, 2004 (#03001352)	211 N. Downtown Mall; 32°18′38″N 106°46′42″W	Las Cruces	
32	San Jose Church	San Jose Church	January 21, 1993 (#92001817)	317 Josephine St. 32°07′23″N 106°42′16″W	La Mesa	
33	Summerford Mountain Archeological District		January 22, 2007 (#06001302)	Address Restricted	Radium Springs	
34	Tortugas Pueblo Fiesta of Our Lady of Guadalupe		August 7, 2017 (#100001437)	Bounded by Emilia Rd., E. Guadalupe St., Juan Diego Ave., and Stern Dr. 32°16′11″N 106°45′10″W	Tortugas	
35	University President's House	University President's House	May 16, 1989 (#88001549)	South of University Ave. between Espina and Solano on the New Mexico State University campus 32°17′02″N 106°45′16″W	Las Cruces	Now the Nason House

== See also ==
- List of National Historic Landmarks in New Mexico
- National Register of Historic Places listings in New Mexico
