= Robert Dietz =

Robert or Bob Dietz may refer to:

- Robert H. Dietz (1921–1945), American Medal of Honor recipient
- Robert S. Dietz (1914–1995), American geophysicist and oceanographer
- Robert Edwin Dietz (1818–1897), American businessman
- Bob Dietz (1917–1999), American professional basketball player

== See also ==
- Robert Deitz (born 1946), American lawyer and intelligence officer
- Robert Dietz Farmhouse, listed on the National Register of Historic Places in Albuquerque, New Mexico
- Robert Dietz Memorial Stadium, in Kingston, New York
