= Tomasa Griego de Garcia House =

Historic house in New Mexico, United States

- U.S. National Register of Historic Places
- NM State Register of Cultural Properties
- Location within New Mexico Location within the United States
- Location: 6939 Edith Blvd. NE, Albuquerque, New Mexico
- Coordinates: 35°9′29″N 106°37′18″W
- Built: c. 1855
- Architectural style: Territorial
- NRHP reference No.: 79001535
- NMSRCP No.: 466

Significant dates
- Added to NRHP: June 19, 1979
- Designated NMSRCP: August 27, 1976

The Tomasa Griego de Garcia House is a historic house in the North Valley of Albuquerque, New Mexico. Its exact age is not known, but it was probably built in the mid-1850s and belonged to Tomasa Griego de Garcia until her death in 1890. The property remained in her family's possession until 1947. In the 1950s, it was purchased by the Koeber family, who enclosed the entrance, rebuilt a collapsed part of the west wing, and added plumbing and electricity. It is located on a private drive just south of another historic building, the Barela–Bledsoe House.

The house is a one-story, U-shaped building with a central placita or courtyard. It originally consisted of two separate wings joined by a zaguan, or covered passageway, which was enclosed in the 1950s to create a foyer. On either side of the entrance are the sala or living room to the west and a combined dining room and kitchen to the east, both of which have corner fireplaces and original ceilings consisting of hand-cut boards supported by vigas. The north end of the west wing was rebuilt in the 1950s and contains a bedroom and study. There is also a bedroom at the north end of the east wing. The house has Territorial-style wooden window trim with pedimented lintels. The walls are 24 to 30 inches (61 to 76 cm) thick and are constructed from terrones (sod bricks).
