= Foster Hall =

Foster Hall may refer to:

- Foster Hall (Indianapolis, Indiana), listed on the National Register of Historic Places in Marion County, Indiana
- Foster Hall (Las Cruces, New Mexico), listed on the National Register of Historic Places in Dona Ana County, New Mexico
- Foster Hall (Prairie View, Texas), formerly listed on the National Register of Historic Places in Waller County, Texas, removed 1994.
