= Our Lady of Purification Catholic Church =

Historic church in New Mexico, United States

- Nuestra Señora de la Candelaria Mission
- U.S. National Register of Historic Places
- U.S. Historic district – Contributing property
- NM State Register of Cultural Properties
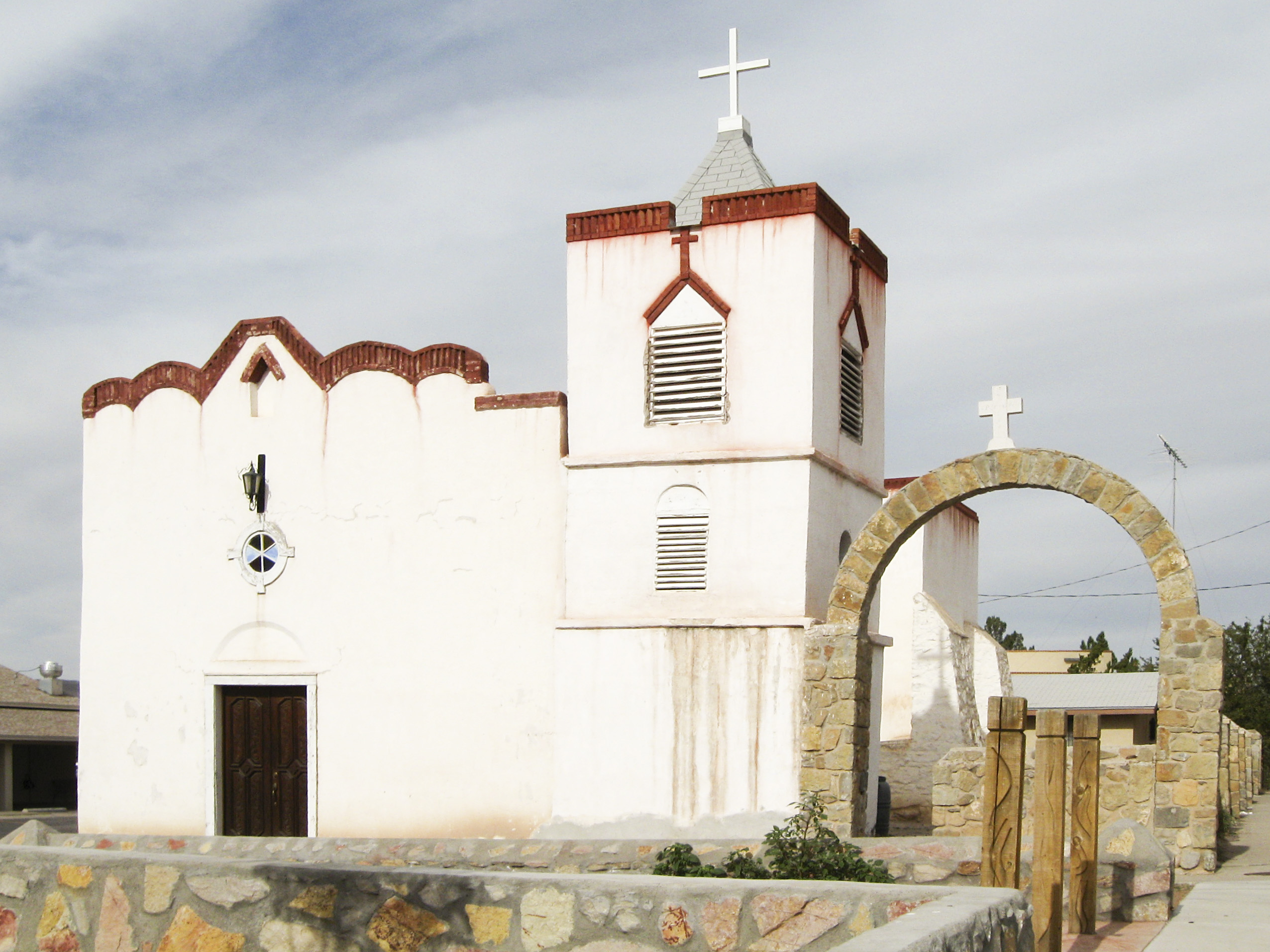

- Location within New Mexico
- Location: Camino Real and 2nd St., Dona Ana, New Mexico
- Coordinates: 32°23′14″N 106°48′59″W
- Area: less than one acre
- Built: c.1844
- Architectural style: Adobe vernacular
- Part of: Dona Ana Village Historic District
- NRHP reference No.: 85001386
- NMSRCP No.: 927

Significant dates
- Added to NRHP: June 27, 1985
- Designated CP: September 27, 1996
- Designated NMSRCP: August 25, 1983

Nuestra Señora de la Candelaria Mission is a historic mission church in Dona Ana, New Mexico near Las Cruces. It was built around 1844 and added to the National Register of Historic Places in 1985.

It is built in the adobe vernacular in style.

It is notable as the oldest example of an adobe vernacular church in southern New Mexico. According to its National Register nomination, its ornamentation and detail "is simple, reflecting the modest resources of the congregation that built it in the middle of the 19th century. The building is of a cruciform floor plan with thick walls made of adobe brick molded by the parishioners and carried up to the site from the valley land below. Until the 1920s, when it was covered with tongue and groove hardwood, the floor was of dirt which often had to be wetted to keep the dust down. As shown by the oldest available photograph of the church taken around 1910, it was built with a flat roof using the traditional viga (beam) and latilla (small poles laid across the vigas) ceiling, and sealed with packed mud that would routinely have to be maintained. This stark, massive structure of earth had a plain twin-leafed entrance with a small window above it. The windows along the church walls are the 6 over 6 double hung wood type. It was probably around the turn of the century that a small wood-louvered bell tower was built above the entrance. The church faces south onto an open dirt plaza which now serves as parking. A garden bordering the east side of the church is enclosed with a stone wall which features an open arch parallel to the church entry."

It is also a contributing building in the Dona Ana Village Historic District, listed on the National Register in 1996.

== See also ==
- National Register of Historic Places listings in Doña Ana County, New Mexico
