= General Bowman =

General Bowman may refer to:

- Frank O. Bowman (1896–1978), U.S. Army major general
- George S. Bowman Jr. (1911–2005), U.S. Marine Corps major general
- Wendell P. Bowman (1847–1928), Pennsylvania National Guard major general
