= Pioneer Park =

Pioneer Park may refer to:

United States

- Pioneer Park (Fairbanks, Alaska), Alaska
- Pioneer Park (San Francisco), California; site of Coit Tower
- Pioneer Park (Aspen, Colorado), a house listed on the National Register of Historic Places
- Pioneer Park (Hardee County, Florida), a park in Zolfo Springs
- Lincoln, Nebraska; also known as Pioneers Park
- Pioneer Park (Los Cruces, New Mexico), in Alameda-Depot Historic District
- Pioneer Park (stadium), Greeneville, Tennessee
- Pioneer Park (Salt Lake City), located near Downtown Salt Lake City
- Pioneer Park (Washington), in Tumwater, Washington
- Moore-Turner Garden, Spokane, Washington; also known as Pioneer Park

South Africa

- Pioneer Park, Johannesburg, in the suburb of Rosettenville, Gauteng on the shore of Wemmer Pan

Australia

- Pioneer Park, Angaston, in the main street of Angaston, South Australia
- Pioneer Park, Fremantle, Western Australia
- Pioneer Park, formerly the site of the Alberton Cemetery, South Australia
- Pioneer Park Speedway, notable speedway venue in Ayr, Queensland
