= Chope =

Chope may refer to:

- Chope (platform), a real-time restaurant-reservation booking platform in Singapore
- Chope (Singapore), a colloquial term in Singaporean English
- Chope (Ninjago), a fictional character from the television series Ninjago
- Christopher Chope (born 1947), a British politician
- Richard Pearse Chope (1862–1938), a British civil servant
- Chope Paljor Tsering (born 1948), a Tibetan politician
- Chope, a sub-dialect of the Acholi dialect
- Chope, a variety of phulkari embroidery

== See also ==
- Chope's Town Cafe and Bar, a bar in La Mesa, New Mexico, United States
