= Ortiz House =

Ortiz House may refer to:

in the United States

- Ortiz House (Yuma, Arizona), listed on the NRHP in Arizona
- Lujan--Ortiz House, Jaconita, NM, listed on the NRHP in New Mexico
- Smaine-Ortiz House, Isabel Segunda, Puerto Rico, listed on the NRHP in Puerto Rico
