= Dona Ana Village Historic District =

Historic district in New Mexico, United States

- Doña Ana Village Historic District
- U.S. National Register of Historic Places
- Location within New Mexico
- Location: Roughly bounded by the Doña Ana lateral irrigation ditch, I-25, NM 320, and Doña Ana School Rd., Doña Ana, New Mexico
- Coordinates: 32°23′17″N 106°48′56″W
- Area: 90 acres (36 ha)
- NRHP reference No.: 96001042
- Added to NRHP: September 27, 1996

The Doña Ana Village Historic District, in Doña Ana, New Mexico, is a historic district which was listed on the National Register of Historic Places in 1996. It included 27 contributing buildings on 90 acres (36 ha).

It is roughly bounded by the Doña Ana lateral irrigation ditch, Interstate 25, New Mexico State Road 320, and Doña Ana School Rd.

The town, founded in 1843, is the oldest permanent settlement in southern New Mexico; numerous earlier settlements did not survive.

The district includes:

- Nuestra Senora de la Purificacion Church, which is separately listed on the National Register
- Maximjano Garcia House (late 1800s)
- more
