= San Jose Church (La Mesa, New Mexico) =

Historic church in New Mexico, United States

- U.S. National Register of Historic Places
- NM State Register of Cultural Properties
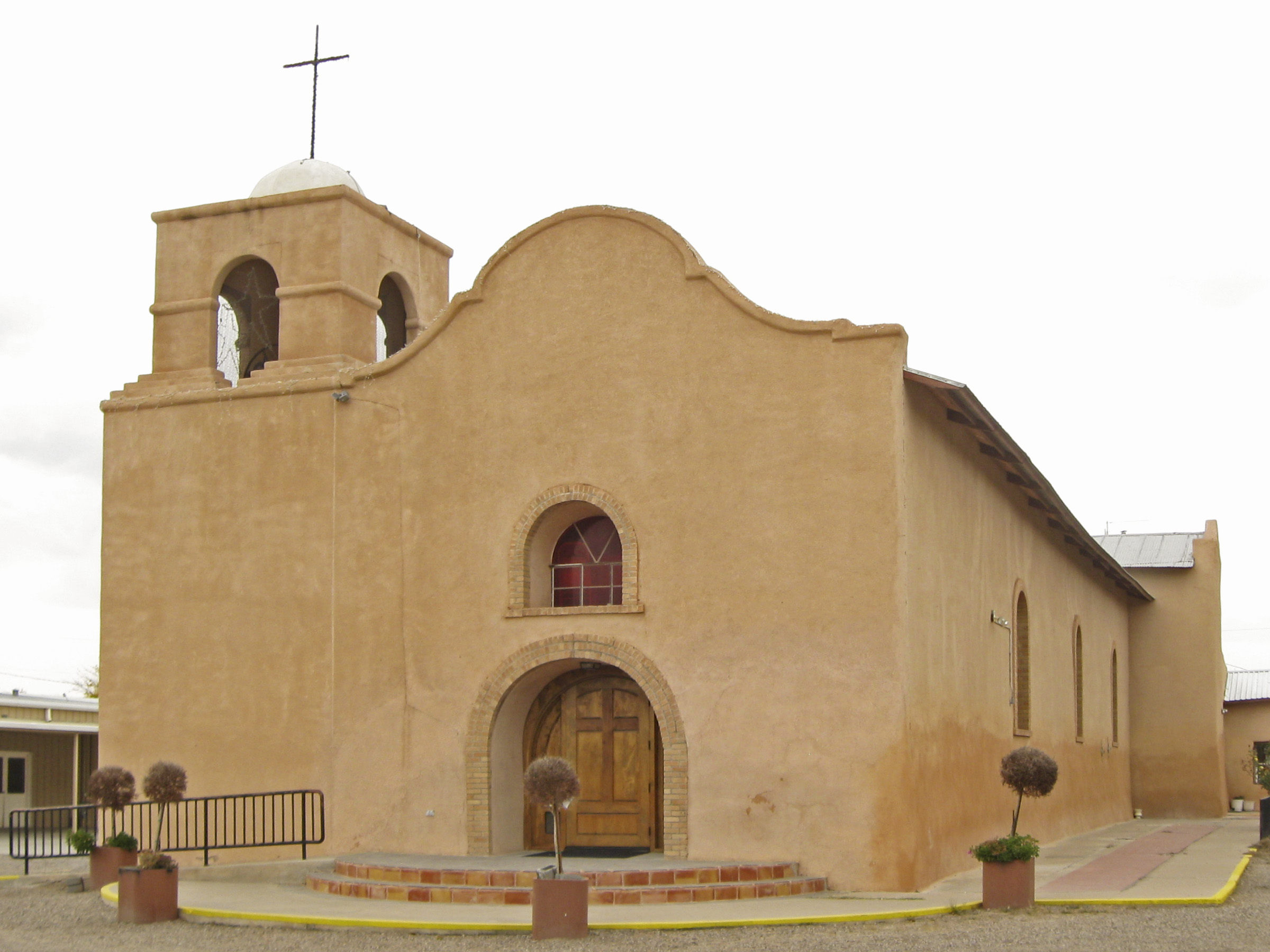

- Location within New Mexico
- Location: 317 Josephine St., La Mesa, New Mexico
- Coordinates: 32°7′23″N 106°42′16″W
- Area: less than one acre
- Built: c.1868-1877
- Architectural style: Mission/Spanish Revival, Pueblo
- NRHP reference No.: 92001817
- NMSRCP No.: 1283

Significant dates
- Added to NRHP: January 21, 1993
- Designated NMSRCP: July 11, 1986

The San Jose Church in La Mesa, New Mexico is a historic church building at 317 Josephine Street. It was built between 1868 and 1877 and added to the National Register of Historic Places in 1993.

It is a small adobe church.

== See also ==
- National Register of Historic Places listings in Doña Ana County, New Mexico
