= Nestor Armijo House =

- U.S. National Register of Historic Places
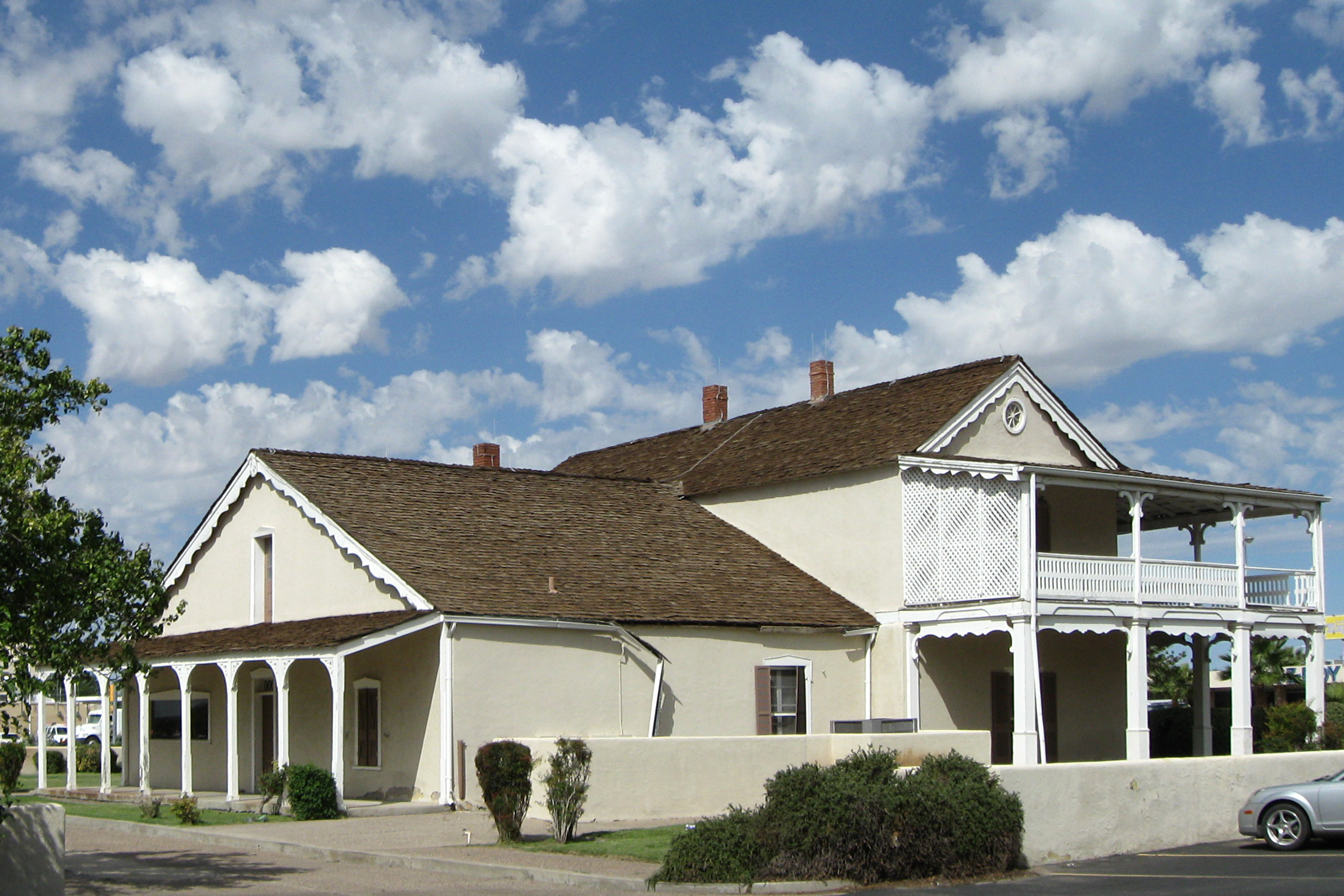
- The house in 2009

- Location within New Mexico
- Location: Lohman Avenue and Church Street, Las Cruces, New Mexico
- Coordinates: 32°18′20″N 106°46′35″W
- Area: 0.4 acres (0.16 ha)
- Built: 1870
- Architectural style: Late Victorian
- NRHP reference No.: 76001195
- Added to NRHP: December 12, 1976

The Nestor Armijo House is a historic house in Las Cruces, New Mexico. It was built in 1870 for Bradford Daily and his wife Maricita. In 1877, it was purchased by Nestor Armijo, a merchant and rancher. When his granddaughters were orphaned in 1902, they moved into his house and lived with him until he died in 1911. One of them, Josephine Armijo Gallagher, lived here with her four children, while the other sister, Gertrude Armijo Ascarate, "refurbished the small building containing the old kitchen and dining room for her residence"; she died in the 1970s. The house was designed in the Late Victorian architectural style. It has been listed on the National Register of Historic Places since December 12, 1976.
