= Frank O. Bowman =

United States Army general (1896–1978)

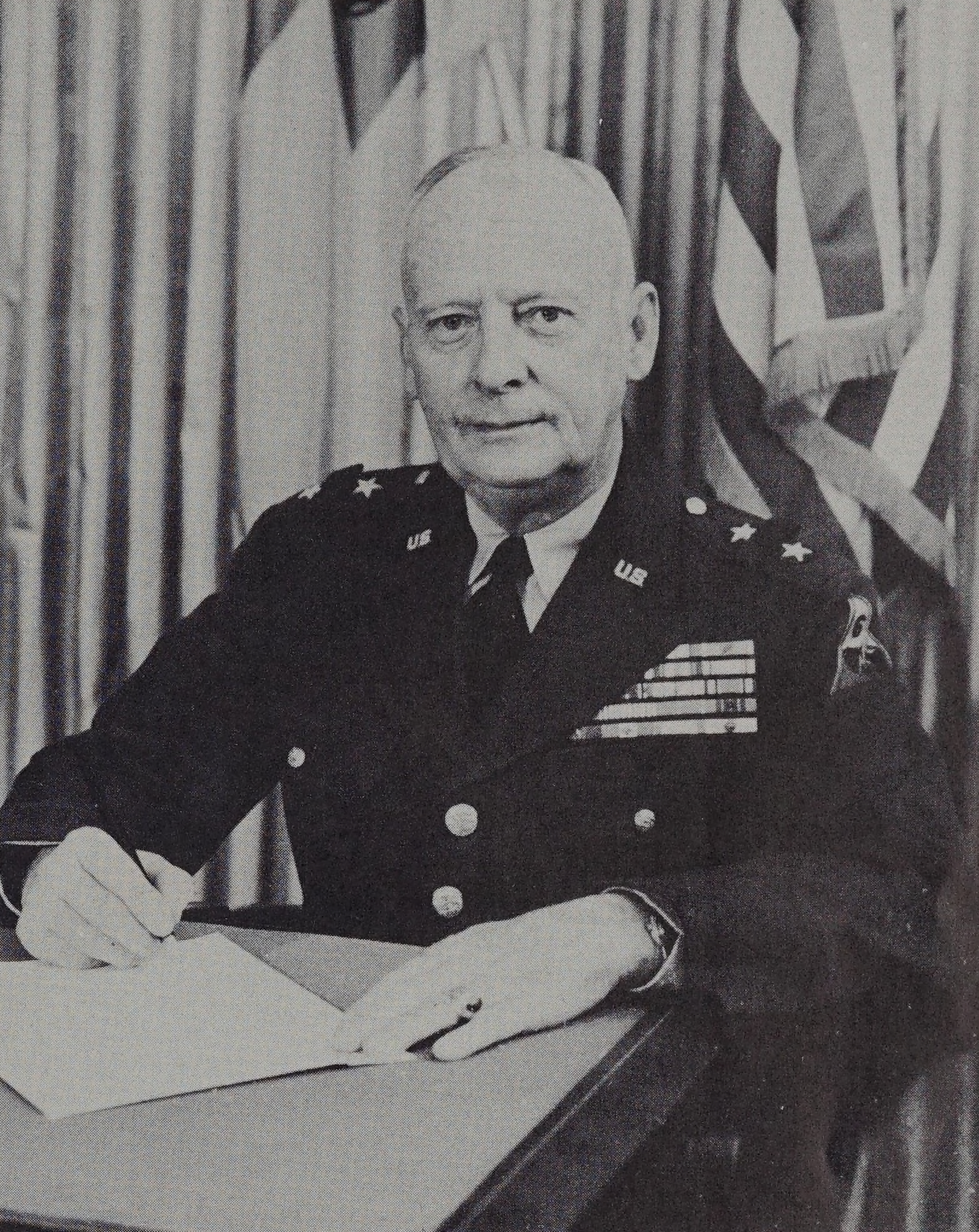
- Bowman as 6th Armored Division commander c. 1956
- Born: July 27, 1896; Mesilla Park, New Mexico Territory
- Died: March 13, 1978 (aged 81); Fort Ord, California
- Burial place: West Point Cemetery
- Occupation: Military officer

Major General Frank Otto Bowman CBE (July 27, 1896 – March 13, 1978) was a United States Army officer.

== Biography ==
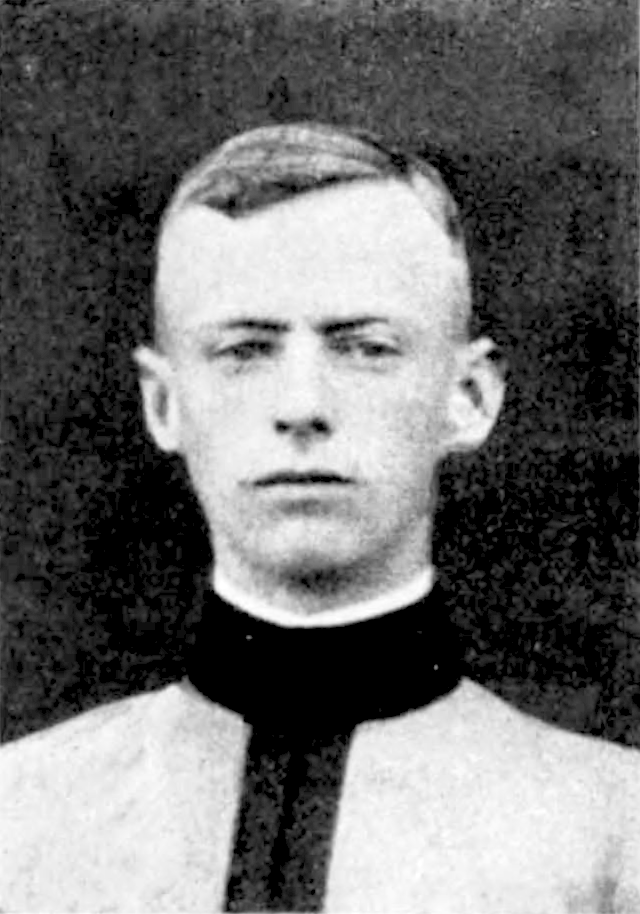
At West Point in 1918

Frank O. Bowman was born in Mesilla Park, New Mexico Territory on July 27, 1896. He was educated at The Hill School and spent one term at New Mexico A&M. Bowman served as an enlisted soldier from January 1915 to February 1916 before entering the West Point Military Academy in June 1916. He graduated in the class of November 1918 and was commissioned in the Army Corps of Engineers.

During World War II, Bowman served as a colonel of engineers in England, North Africa and Italy. He was promoted to brigadier general in February 1944. After the war, he served in Japan and Okinawa from September 1945 to June 1946.

Bowman was promoted to major general in January 1951. In early 1953 before the end of the Korean War, he became Engineer, Headquarters Army Forces Far East. Bowman retired from active duty on June 30, 1956.

Bowman moved to Carmel, California after his military retirement. He frequently traveled to South Korea as a civilian engineer until June 1959. Bowman later served two years as chief advisor to the Korean Joint Construction Agency until his permanent retirement in October 1963. He died at Fort Ord, California on March 13, 1978, and was buried at West Point Cemetery.

== Honors ==
- Legion of Merit (3)
- Army Distinguished Service Medal
- Purple Heart
- Honorary Commander, Order of the British Empire
- Croix de Guerre avee Etoile de Vermeil (France)
- Silver Medal for Valor (Italy)
- Commander of the Order of the Crown of Italy
- Medalha de Guerra (Brazil)
- Order of the Military Ulchi with Gold Star (Korea)
