= Luther Foster =

Pioneer agricultural scientist and educator

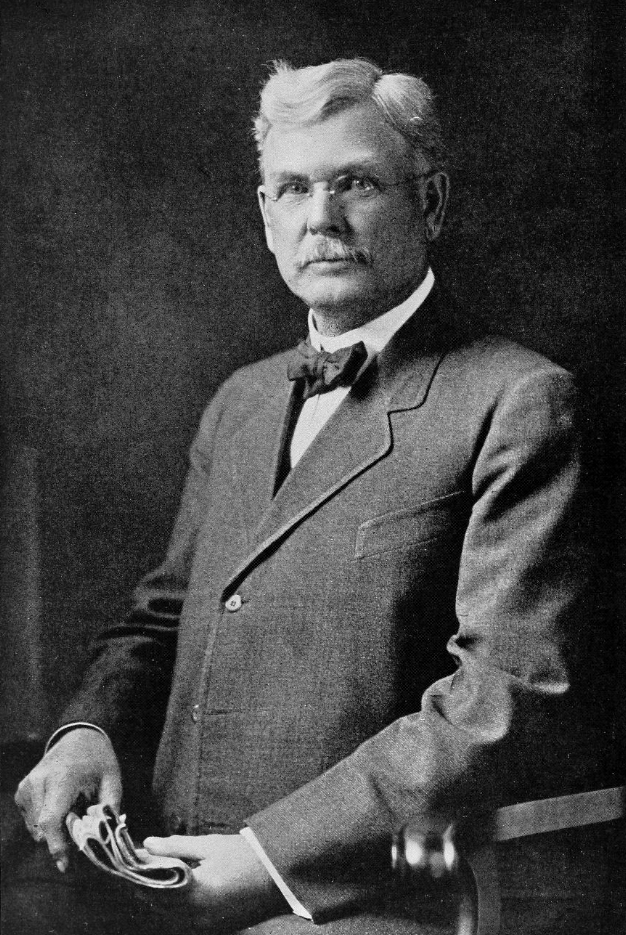
- Born: October 8, 1849; Whitehall, Indiana, US
- Died: June 17, 1933 (aged 83); Las Cruces, New Mexico, US
- Education: Iowa State College
- Occupations: Scientist, educator
- Spouse: Mary Lizzy Curtis (m. 1876)

Luther Foster (October 8, 1849 – June 17, 1933) was a scientist and pioneer educator of agriculture in the Western United States in the later half of the 1800s and the early 1900s. Foster's 50-year career at agricultural experiment stations throughout the western United States and as a professor of agriculture provided students, farmers and ranchers with important scientific research that helped them solve problems and improve their operations. In September 1901 he was elected to the presidency of New Mexico Agricultural College (which later became New Mexico State University) and served until 1908.

== Personal life ==
Luther Foster was born in Whitehall, Indiana on October 5, 1849. When he was 14 years old, he enlisted in the Union Army, not being completely truthful about his age: He told the enlistment agent that he was "over 18"; since he had written "18" on the sole of his shoe, he felt he was being honest. Foster served 18 months as a private in the Third Regiment, Iowa Volunteer Cavalry, L Company.

After the war, Luther Foster continued his education. He attended Iowa State College (now Iowa State University) and was a member of the first graduating class (1872), one of 26 graduates. He earned a Bachelor of Science degree in agriculture in 1872. Iowa State did not have a post graduate program in those years but Foster stayed on for two more years taking more agriculture classes. In 1876 Foster was awarded an honorary Master's degree in Agriculture from Iowa State College.

On July 20, 1876, Foster married his college sweetheart, Mary Lizzy (Lou) Curtis.

After college, Foster took a job as a school principal in Prairie City, Iowa, and at the Monticello School in Monticello, Iowa.

He died in Las Cruces, New Mexico on June 17, 1933.

== Work at agricultural experiment stations ==
Agricultural experiment stations were, and still are, important scientific research centers that investigate difficulties and potential improvements to food production and agribusiness. These station scientists work with farmers, ranchers, suppliers, processors and others involved in food production and agriculture.

Luther Foster's career in agricultural research and education at the Agricultural Experiment Stations spanned 50 years. The results of his studies were published in newspapers and scientific journals benefiting farmers all over the Western United States. Subjects included cattle feeding, sugar beets, corn experiments, pork production, irrigation, poultry, soil improvement, seed care, alfalfa growing, and forestry.

Luther Foster worked at the following Agricultural Experiment Stations, serving as either a staff scientist, vice-director or director;

- Ames, Iowa
- Brookings, South Dakota (1888 to 1892)
- Bozeman, Montana (1893 to 1896)
- Logan, Utah (1896 to 1900)
- Laramie, Wyoming (1900 to 1901)
- Las Cruces, New Mexico (1901 to 1933)

== Career in higher education ==
Luther Foster was hired as a professor of agriculture, horticulture and forestry on July 15, 1885, at Dakota Agricultural College (now South Dakota State University), Brookings, South Dakota.

On July 18, 1900, Foster was elected chair of agriculture and horticulture and vice director of the Agricultural Experiment State at Wyoming State University (now University of Wyoming).

Montana State University was founded in 1893 while he was there at the Agricultural Experiment Station. On opening day (February 16), there were three faculty members and eight students. Luther Foster (one of the three faculty members) was described as a horticulturalist from South Dakota. Foster also taught Agronomy and Botany.

In September 1901, Luther Foster was appointed President of the New Mexico Agricultural College. He served as president until 1908. He retired in 1921 at the age of 71 after 50 years as an educator. On his death in 1933, H. L. Kent, president of New Mexico State College, honored Professor Foster for his valuable service in the educational field. Foster spent practically his entire life developing agricultural research and is responsible for much of the advancements made during that time. President Kent characterized him as a "patriot, teacher, administrator, scientific investigator and constructive builder as well as a fine Christian gentleman, good citizen and good neighbor." The current New Mexico State University at Las Cruces, honored Luther Foster by naming the agricultural building after him, Foster Hall.

== Publications ==
- Foster, Luther (1891). "Small Grain", South Dakota Agricultural College and Experiment Station. Issue 21.
