= R. E. Dietz Company =

Lighting products manufacturer

R. E. Dietz Co., Ltd.
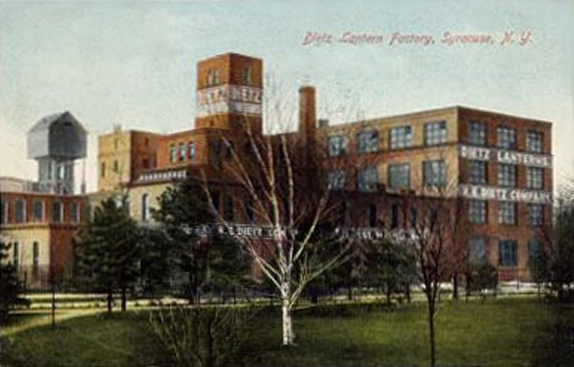
- Dietz Lantern Factory, c. 1910
- Formerly: R. E. Dietz Company (1840–1956)
- Type: Private
- Industry: Lighting
- Founded: 1840 in New York, United States
- Founder: Robert Edwin Dietz
- Headquarters: Kowloon, Hong Kong
- Key people: William Henry Dietz; Amasmus French
- Products: Carcel lamp; Hot and cold Blast Tubular Lanterns
- Website: redietz.com

R. E. Dietz Co., Ltd. (formerly R. E. Dietz Company) is a lighting products manufacturer best known for its hot blast and cold blast kerosene lanterns. It also manufactured automotive lams and electric headlights.

== History ==
The company was founded in 1840 when its founder, 22-year-old Robert Edwin Dietz, purchased a lamp and oil business in Brooklyn, New York. One of the earliest and noted innovations of the company was the kerosene lamp, which Robert Dietz developed with Ignacy Lukasiewicz in the 1850s. Known as the Lukasiewicz lamp, it was widely used to illuminate train stations. In 1897, the company bought Steam Gauge Lantern Company. Another invention was the flat-wick lamp, which produced clean, bright, and steady flame. Some of the company's lamp products include the "Dainty Tail Lamp", "Handy Generator", "Sterling Side Lamp", and the "Majestic Mirror Lens Headlight".

Though famous for well-built indoor and outdoor kerosene lanterns, it was a major player in the automotive lighting industry from the 1900s into the 1960s.

Dietz also produced the majority of road work warning lights, the first of which were oil lanterns (with their Traffic-Gard trademark) and road torches which looked like cannonballs with large wicks. Kerosene was normally used in these lamps. Later they developed some of the first transistorized warning lights (Visi-Flash trademark) using standard 6-volt lantern batteries, which either blinked in timed intervals or had a steady light.

Gerry Dietz reestablished the company in Hong Kong and as of 1956, they moved their production outside of the United States, first to Hong Kong until 1988 when they moved production to China.

== In popular culture ==
The 1992 made-for-cable television film The Water Engine stars William H. Macy as an employee of the Dietz Company who invents an engine that runs on distilled water. Unscrupulous lawyers attempt to take possession of the invention based on the claim that it was built from parts and tools owned by Dietz.

Dietz Tubular Lanterns
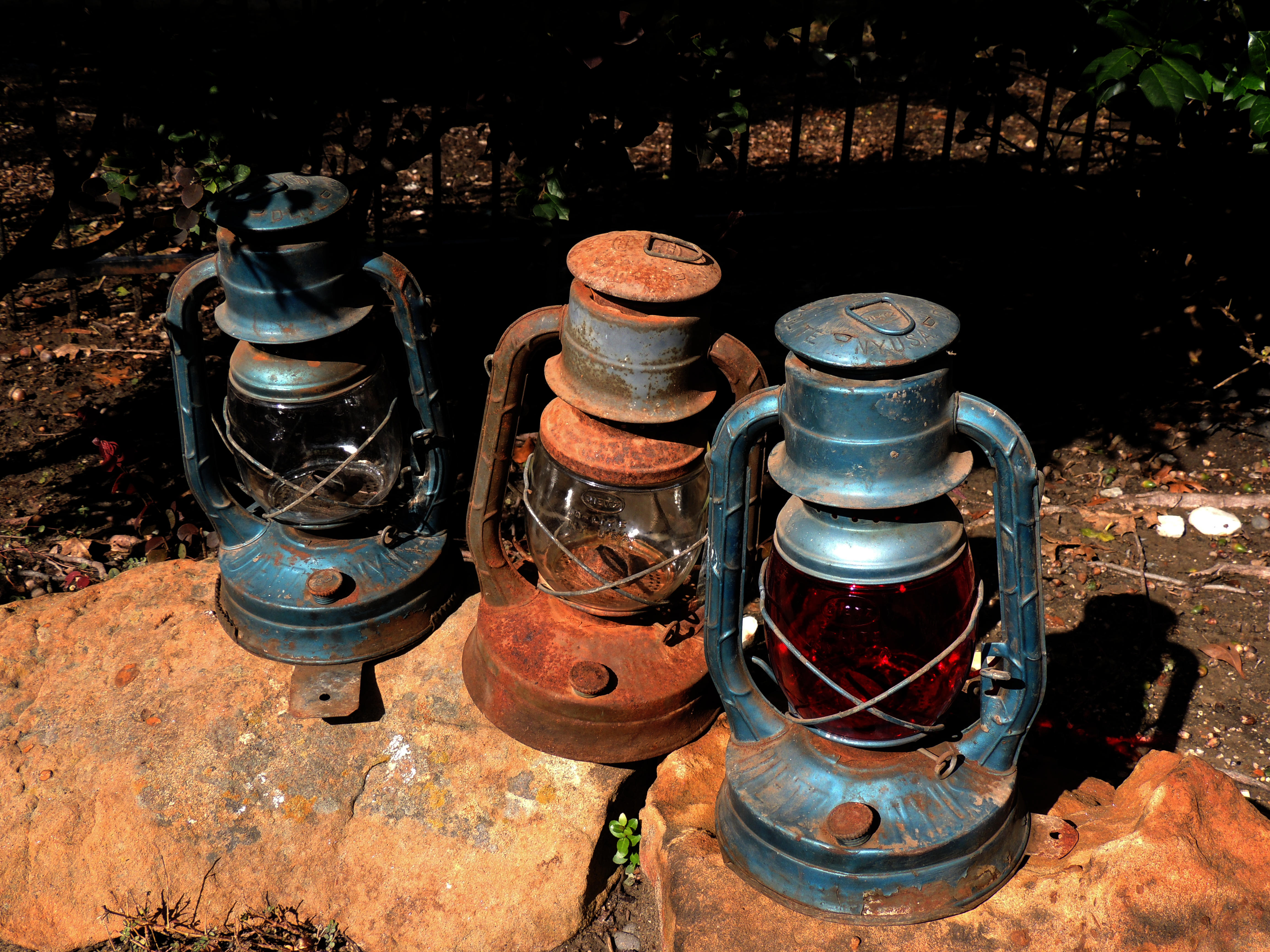
Dietz No. 2 D-Lite New York USA Lanterns

== See also ==
- Lantern

== External links and sources ==
- Dietz Traffic-Gard history
- R.E. Dietz company timeline
