= Hadley-Ludwick House =

- Hadley--Ludwick House
- U.S. National Register of Historic Places
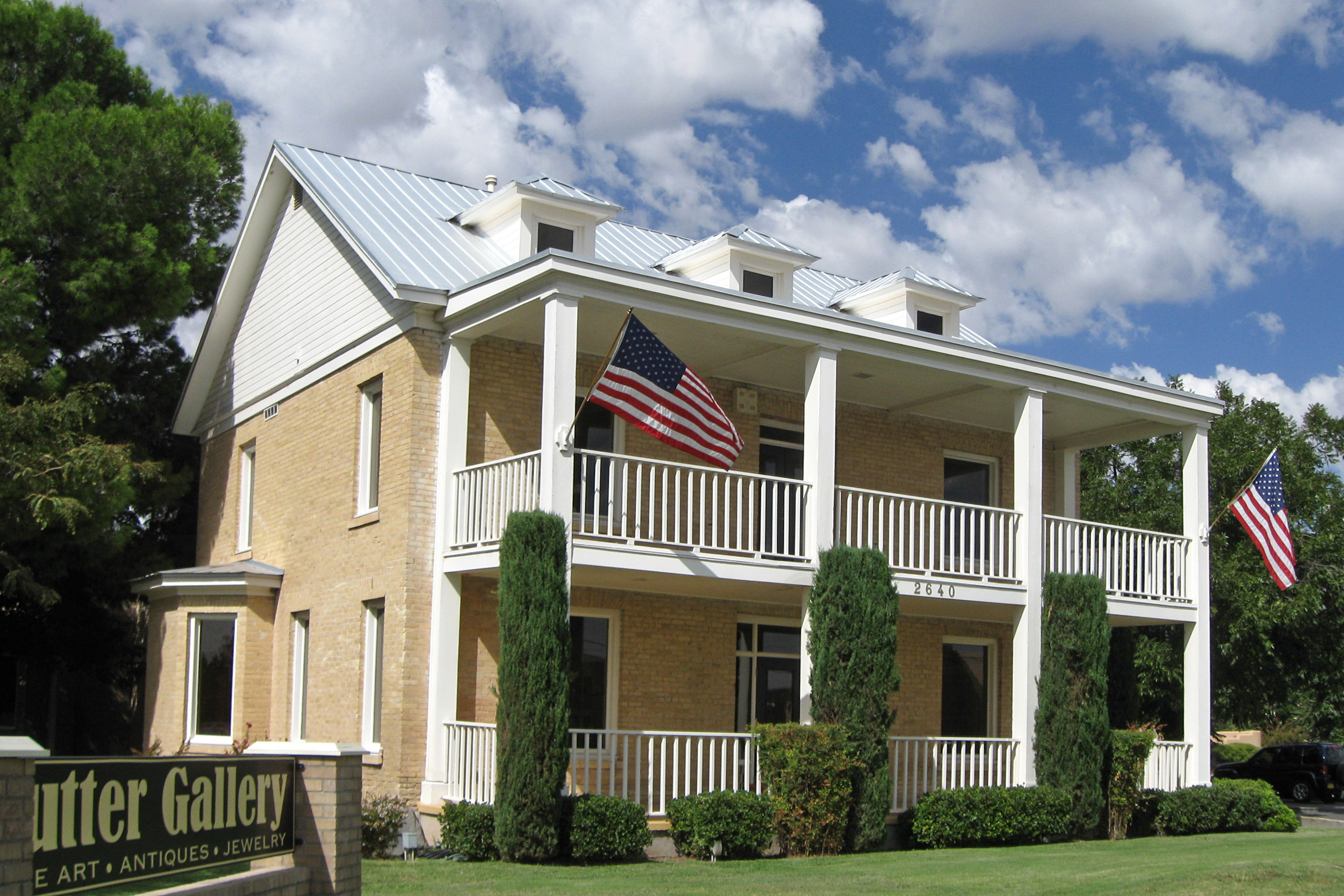
- The house in 2009

- Location within New Mexico
- Location: 2640 El Paseo, Las Cruces, New Mexico
- Coordinates: 32°16′59″N 106°45′42″W
- Area: less than one acre
- Built: 1907
- Architectural style: Colonial Revival
- NRHP reference No.: 91000352
- Added to NRHP: April 3, 1991

The Hadley-Ludwick House is a historic house in Las Cruces, New Mexico. It was built in 1907 for Hiram Hadley, the founder of Las Cruces College, later known as New Mexico State University. The house was designed in the Colonial Revival architectural style. It has been listed on the National Register of Historic Places since April 3, 1991.
