= Thomas Branigan Memorial Library =

Public library serving Las Cruces, New Mexico, United States

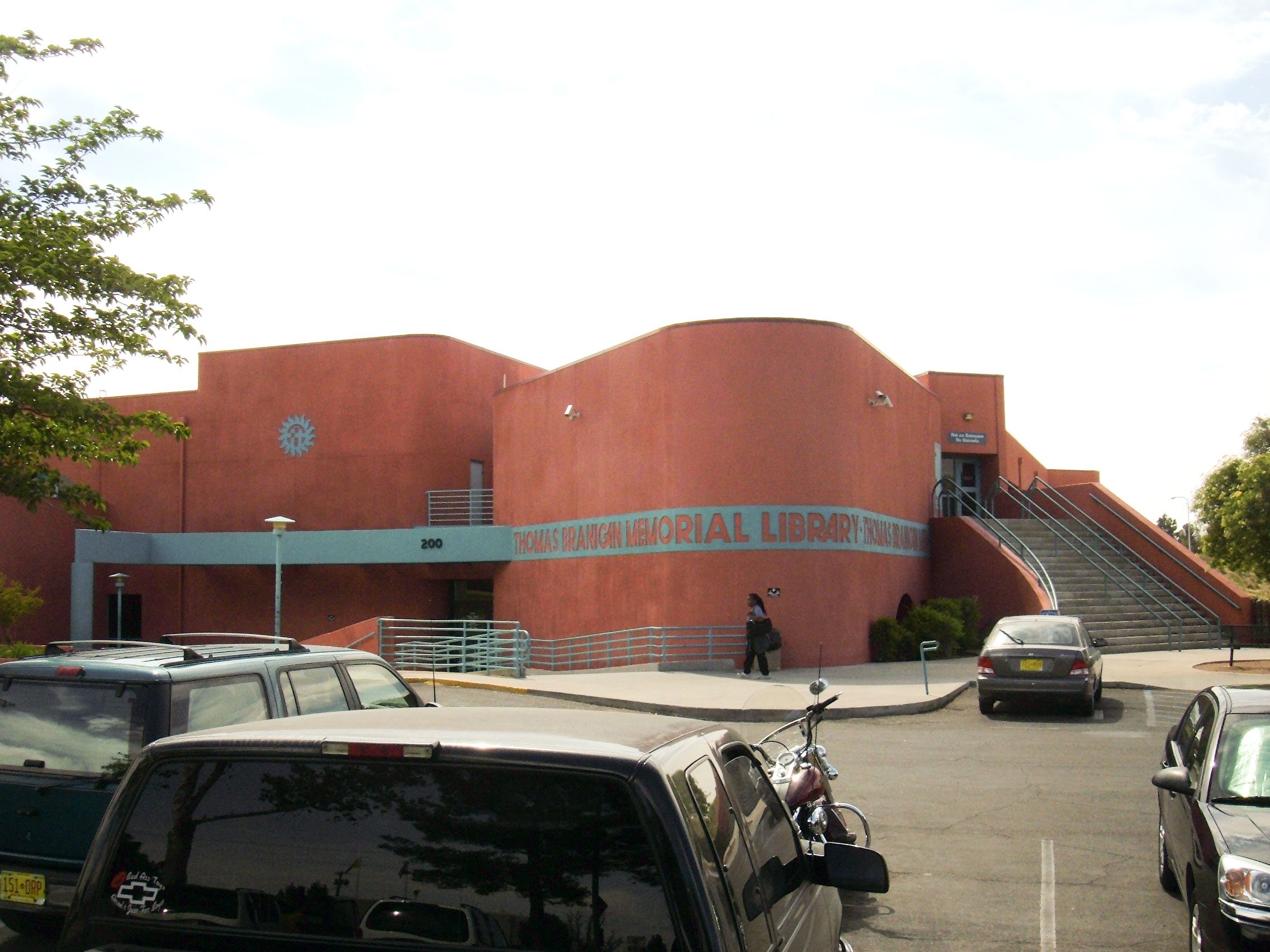
- The library building in 2008
- Location: Las Cruces, New Mexico, United States
- Type: Public library
- Established: 1935
- Branches: 2 (Robert Munson Senior Center, Sage Cafe)

Collection
- Size: 187,623

Access and use
- Circulation: 541,036 (2008)
- Population served: 100,377 (legal service area)
- Members: 73,252

Other information
- Budget: $2,630,700 (2008)
- Director: Sarah Booth (2023 to present)
- Employees: 41 FTE
- Website: http://library.las-cruces.org/
- Branigan, Thomas, Memorial Library
- U.S. National Register of Historic Places
- NM State Register of Cultural Properties
- Location within New Mexico
- Location: 106 W. Hadley St., Las Cruces, New Mexico
- Coordinates: 32°18′52″N 106°46′48″W
- Area: Less than one acre
- Built: 1935
- Architect: McGhee, Percy Ware Jr.; Lembke, Edward & Co.
- Architectural style: Pueblo
- NRHP reference No.: 04000981
- NMSRCP No.: 1861

Significant dates
- Added to NRHP: September 15, 2004
- Designated NMSRCP: December 12, 2003

Thomas Branigan Memorial Library; often referred to as simply "Branigan", is the public library serving Las Cruces, New Mexico, United States. It is part of Las Cruces Public Libraries.

== History ==
The library was founded in 1935, and a library building was constructed at 106 W. Hadley (now 501 N. Main Street) as the result of a bequest from Mrs. Alice Branigan in memory of her husband Capt. Thomas Branigan. Its immediate predecessor was the Woman's Improvement Association library founded in 1924; this library was disbanded in 1935 when the Branigan Library opened, and its collection became the core of the Branigan collection.

The current 36,800-square-foot (3,420 m^{2}) library building at 200 E. Picacho Avenue was constructed in 1979 on the site of the former Lucero School (1942–1963). The architects were Dean and Hunt Associates Ltd of Albuquerque. The building was dedicated on December 9, 1979. The 1935 library building is now the Branigan Cultural Center, and is on the National Register of Historic Places.

The 1979 library was constructed on two floors, with the collection on the first floor and offices and work areas on the second floor. In 1992 a computer lab was added. It was expanded in 1999 with a Gates Foundation Grant. Beginning in 2008, part of the collection was moved to the second floor.

The library is running out of space, and is looking at plans for expansion and opening branch libraries. In July 2003, the library opened a satellite library in the Robert Munson Senior Center. A second satellite location is available at the Sage Cafe Senior Center. In 2010 the new public computer lab revamp and the Roadrunner Room addition were completed.

Carol A. Brey-Casiano, the library director from 1996 to 2000, was president of the American Library Association for 2004–2005. In 2023 the library system rebranded, becoming Las Cruces Public Libraries. The Thomas Branigan Memorial Library Branch retained its name.

== Services ==
Library cards are free to residents of Doña Ana County. Cardholders can check out books, audiobooks, ebooks, e-audio books, compact discs, videos, art prints, and magazines. They can also access a variety of digital resources, including databases and streaming services.

Summer reading programs have been running since 1972 A homebound delivery program began in 1973. Two bookmobiles were purchased in 1975, and service continued until 2008 when they were replaced by a books-by-mail program. Children's story time began in 1937.

== See also ==
- National Register of Historic Places listings in Doña Ana County, New Mexico
