= Woman's Improvement Association of Las Cruces =

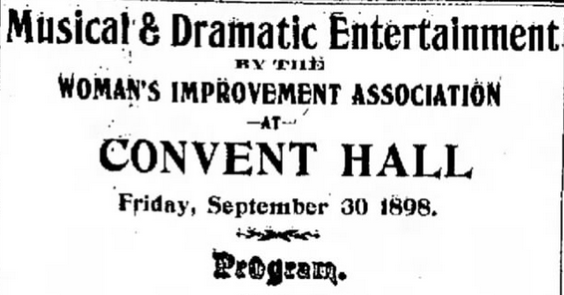
Advert for WIA program in Las Cruces, September 30, 1898

The Woman's Improvement Association (WIA) of Las Cruces, New Mexico (later known as the W.I.A. Las Cruces Woman's Club) was the first woman's club in Las Cruces and the second established in New Mexico. The group was active in Las Cruces until it was dissolved in 2000. WIA was responsible for creating the first park, first swimming pool, and first library in the city. Members worked to improve community life around the city.

== History ==
The Woman's Improvement Association (WIA) of Las Cruces, New Mexico was established in 1894. It was the first woman's club in the city and the second oldest woman's club in the state. Several women worked together articles of incorporation for WIA, including Mary S. McFie, Kate Reymond, Emma E. Dawson, Ida Llewellyn and Emelia Ascarate. WIA became affiliated with the General Federation of Women's Clubs (GFWC). Members of the organization worked to improve the community in tangible ways, as well as advocating for social change, such as in their support of women's suffrage. By 1902, there were 11 members.

WIA bought the city's first hearse so that the dead could "go to the grave site with dignity." The group also bought a sprinkler to fight the dust on dirt roads and installed drinking fountains for animals. WIA obtained the title to land in 1896 that they would later make into a park. In 1898 WIA created Union Park, which was later known as Pioneer Women's Park. WIA maintained the park and provided for various improvements, such as fences and shade trees. The park was also known as City Park and was later donated to the City of Las Cruces in 1924.

WIA was involved in establishing the first Las Cruces library and the city's first swimming pool. The first library, started in 1924, was the forerunner to the Thomas Branigan Memorial Library. It was located in WIA's clubhouse in the east section of Pioneer Woman's Park and was a subscription library. The WIA library closed in 1935 and the collection was donated to Branigan Library. WIA was involved in aiding the work of various health institutions in Las Cruces. Members of WIA also taught and worked to learn Spanish and taught citizenship classes.

The group changed their name to the W.I.A. Las Cruces Woman's Club in 1938. The group decided to dissolve WIA through a decision made by officers and members in 1998. WIA was disestablished in July 2000.
