= Phillips Chapel CME Church =

Historic church in New Mexico, United States

- U.S. National Register of Historic Places
- NM State Register of Cultural Properties
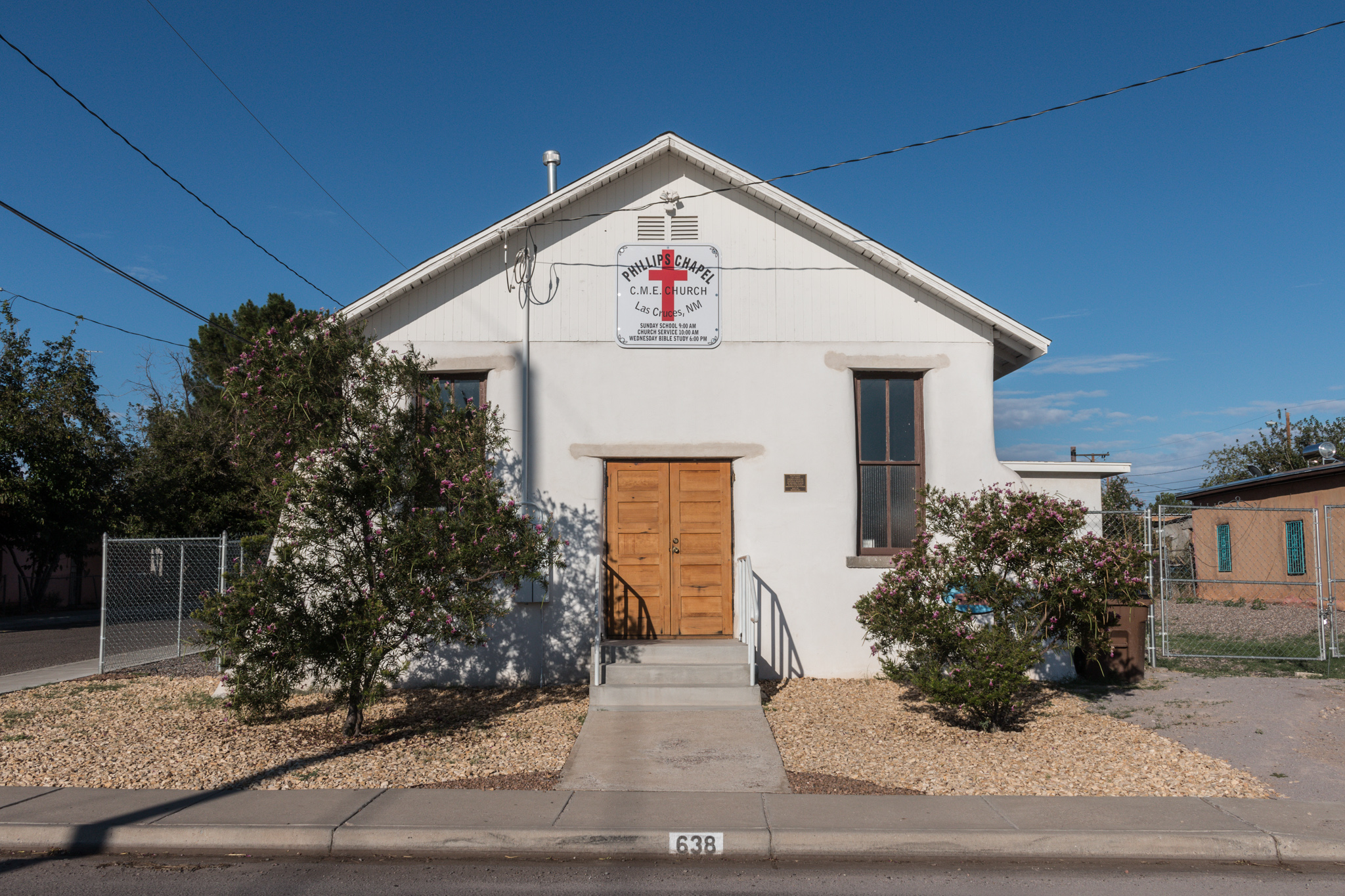
- Post-restoration photo, front view

- Location within New Mexico Location within the United States
- Location: 638 N. Tornillo St., Las Cruces, New Mexico
- Coordinates: 32°18′54″N 106°46′25″W
- Area: less than one acre
- Built: 1912
- NRHP reference No.: 03000735
- NMSRCP No.: 1828

Significant dates
- Added to NRHP: August 4, 2003
- Designated NMSRCP: July 13, 2003

Phillips Chapel CME Church (also known as Lincoln High School) is a historic Christian Methodist Episcopal church building at 638 N. Tornillo Street in Las Cruces, New Mexico. It was built in 1912 and added to the National Register of Historic Places in 2003.

It is a one-story adobe building, about 29 by 38 feet (8.8 m × 11.6 m) in plan, with buttresses against its front. It was described in its National Register nomination as "representative of vernacular church architecture showing a modest influence of local Spanish/Hispano architectural traditions."

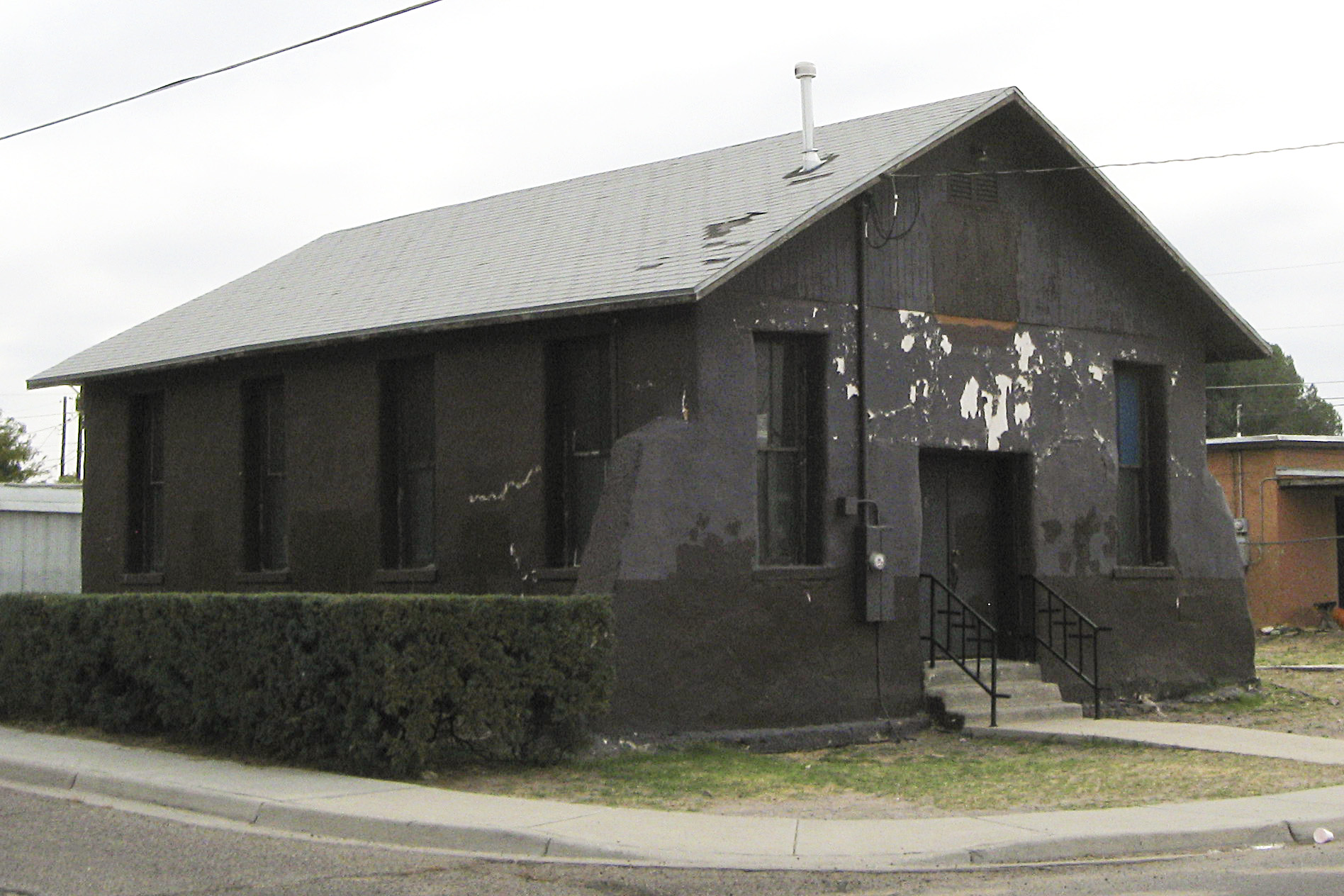
Pre-restoration photo

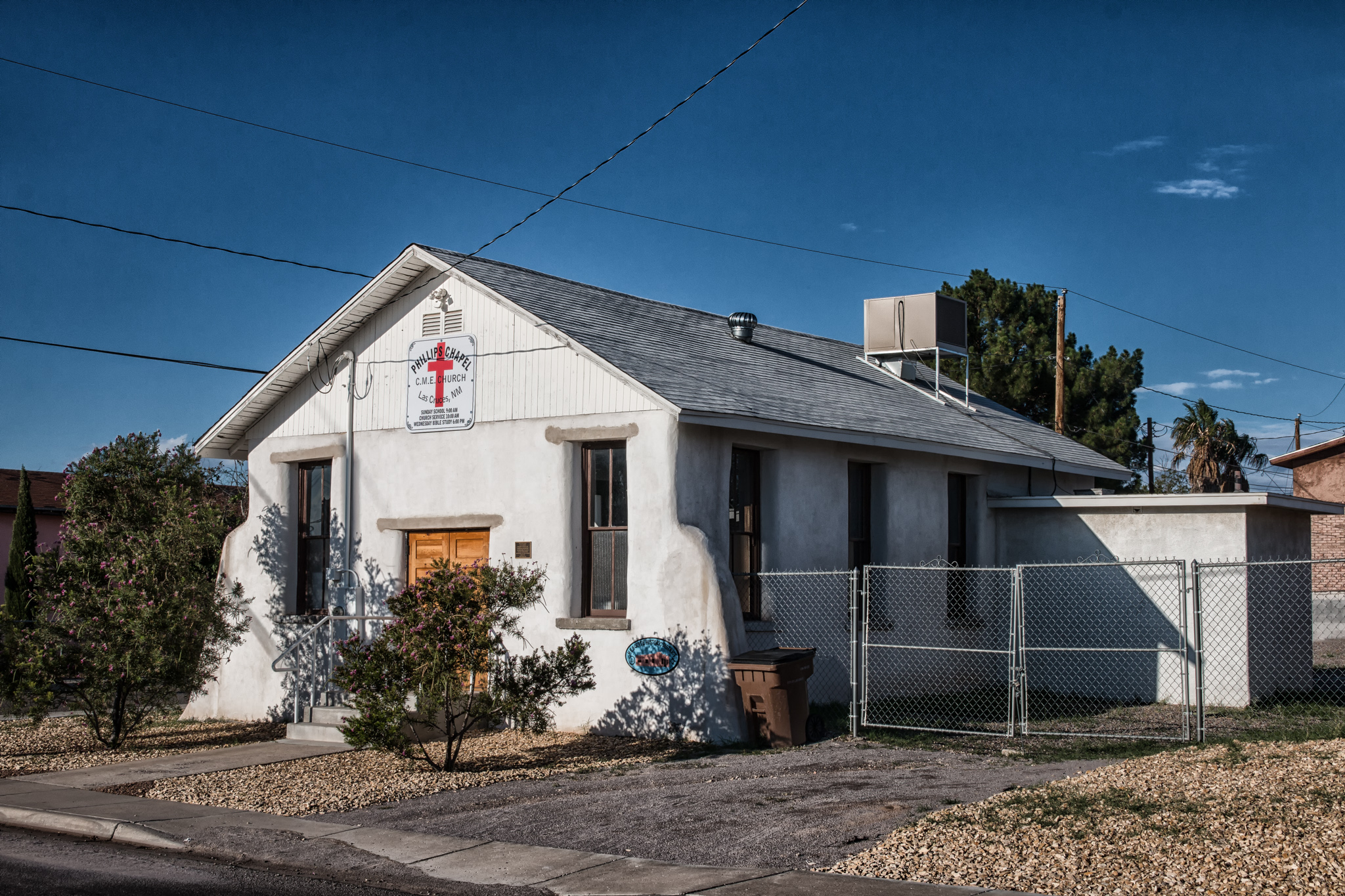
Post-restoration photo

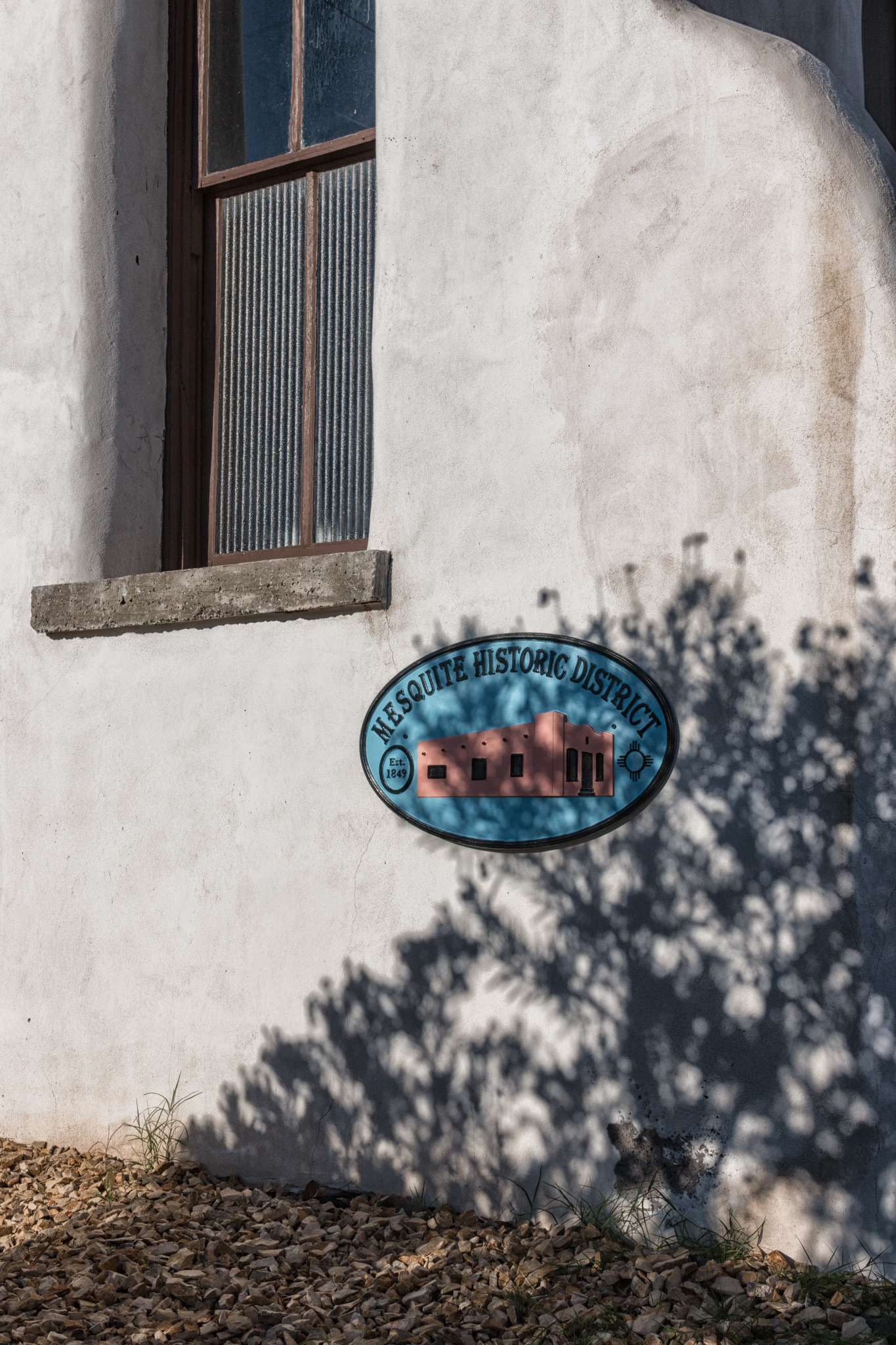
Mesquite Historic District commemorative plaque on the Phillips Chapel CME church

It underwent an extensive restoration project starting around 2010 and ending in 2016.

== See also ==
- National Register of Historic Places listings in Doña Ana County, New Mexico
