= Barela-Reynolds House =

- U.S. National Register of Historic Places
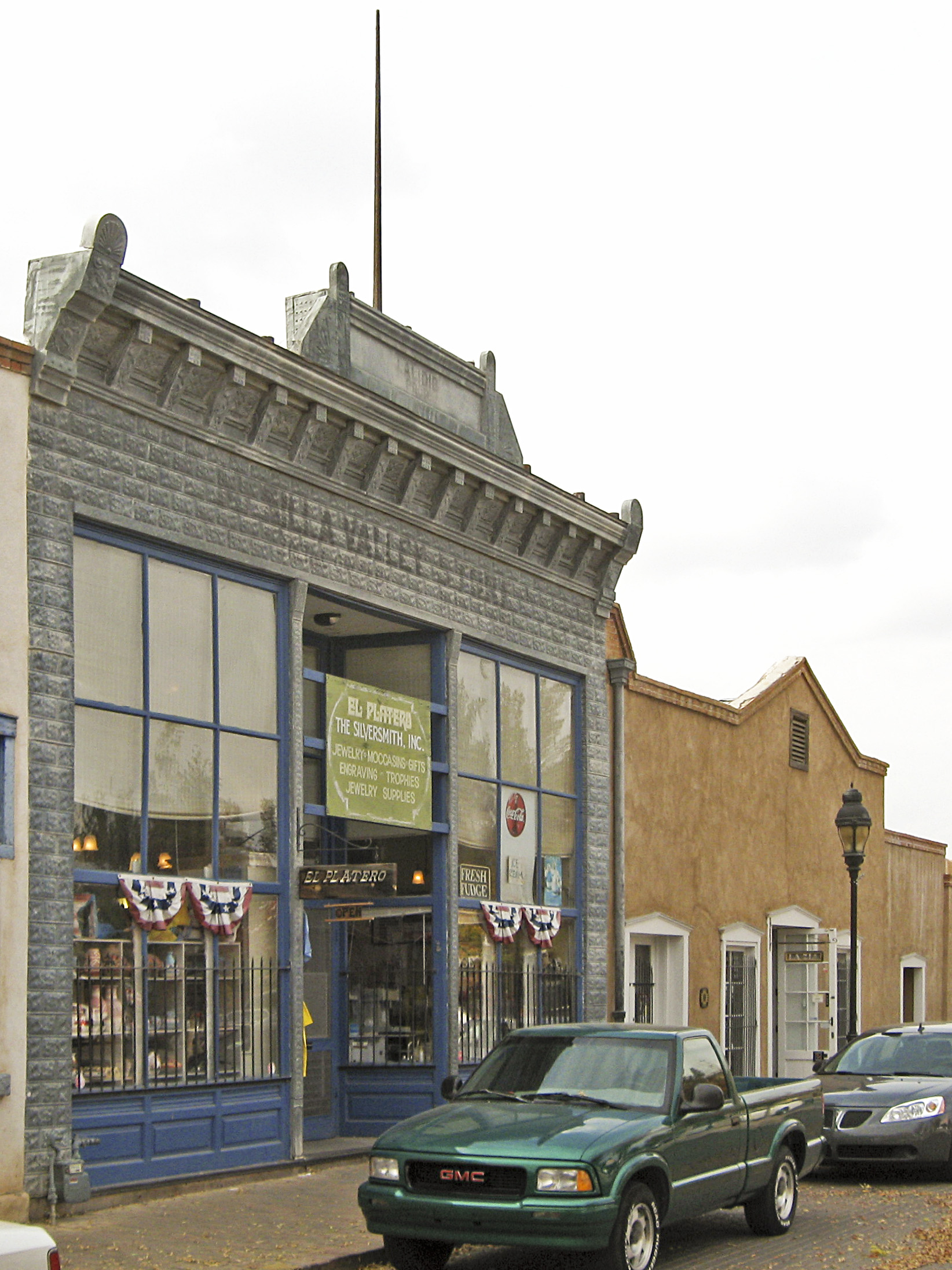
- Front facade of the two-part property in 2009. Reynolds house portion to the left (south); Barela house portion is to the right (north). The central zaguan is through the first doorway in the Barela house facade.

- Location within New Mexico
- Location: Off NM 292, Mesilla, New Mexico
- Coordinates: 32°16′27″N 106°47′43″W
- Area: 0.5 acres (0.20 ha)
- Built: c.1850
- Architectural style: Territorial
- NRHP reference No.: 78001815
- Added to NRHP: January 20, 1978

The Barela-Reynolds House is a historic adobe and brick building complex on the historic plaza in Mesilla, New Mexico, with a store at the front and a house at the rear. A zaguan (covered entryway) leads to a rear courtyard about 30 by 30 feet (9.1 m × 9.1 m) in plan, enclosed by the buildings, the oldest of which were built around 1850. Two separate parts were merged into one property in 1903. North of the zaguan was a store operated during the 1850s by trader Mariano Yrissari and later by trader Mariano Barela. The front of this portion is topped by a triangular parapet, a Greek Revival style feature adopted into New Mexico's Territorial style, and the triangle is repeated in pedimented lintels of two doorways and two large windows. This part was a silversmith shop, "El Platero", in 1977 (per National Register nomination), which moved to the other part by 2009 (per photo). South of the zaguan is a portion occupied by an antique shop, "Las Viejas", in 1977 (and occupied by "El Platero" in 2009). This part has a cast iron front and a metal, bracketed cornice, with a flagpole centered above. It was the "notions and dry goods department" of the Reynolds and Griggs Co., a firm which operated feed and grocery business in the next building to the south, not part of this property.

Part of the complex was built around 1850, the year that the New Mexico Territory was established, for Anastacio Barela and his wife, Maria Rafaela Garcia Barela. It was purchased and remodelled by William Charles Reynolds in 1903–04. From 1913 to 1937, it belonged to Fr. Juan Grange of San Albino Church, who taught catechism here. Part of the present property was purchased and refurbished by J. Paul Taylor in 1953. The building has been listed on the National Register of Historic Places since January 20, 1978.
