= Barela–Bledsoe House =

Historic house in New Mexico, United States

- U.S. National Register of Historic Places
- NM State Register of Cultural Properties
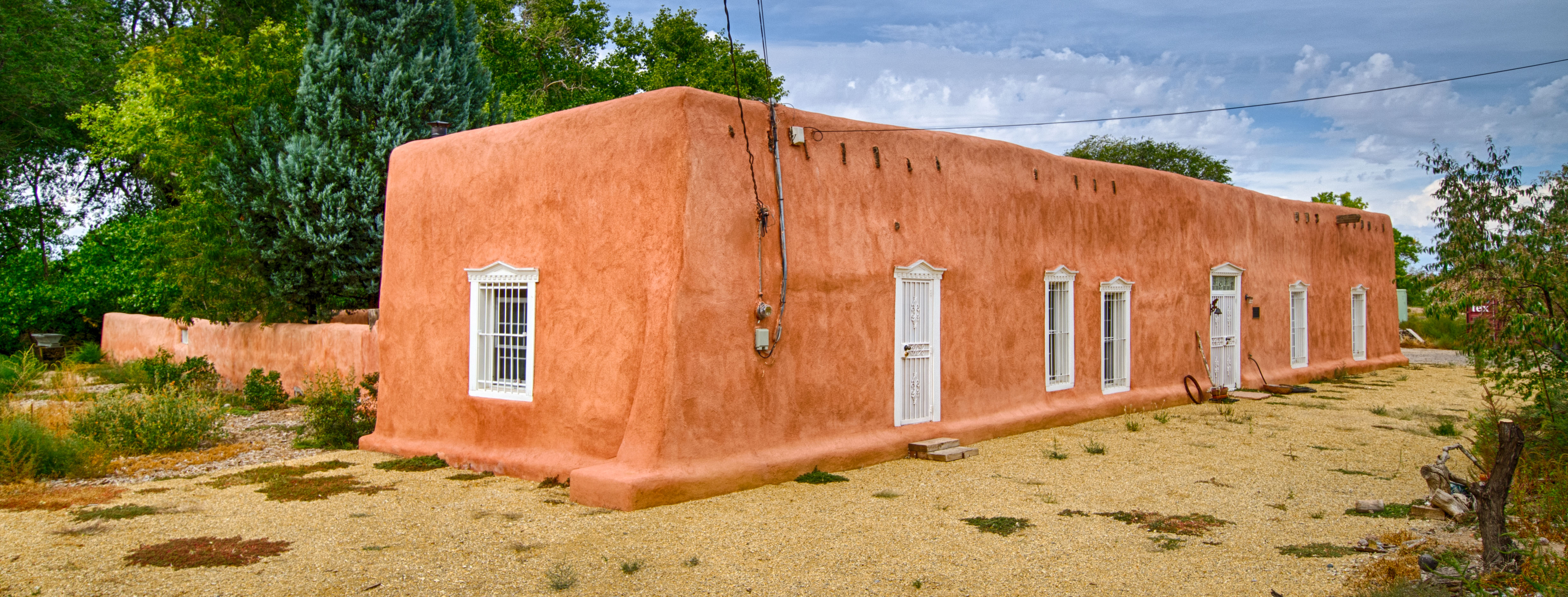
- The house in 2012

- Location within New Mexico Location within the United States
- Location: 7017 Edith Blvd. NE, Albuquerque, New Mexico
- Coordinates: 35°9′32″N 106°37′14″W
- Built: c. 1870
- Architectural style: Territorial
- NRHP reference No.: 79001534
- NMSRCP No.: 462

Significant dates
- Added to NRHP: March 12, 1979
- Designated NMSRCP: August 27, 1976

The Barela–Bledsoe House is a historic house in the North Valley of Albuquerque, New Mexico. It was built around 1870 by Juan Estevan Barela (1842–1886), a prosperous farmer and merchant. At the time of his death, he owned over 100 acres (0.40 km^{2}) of land and 13,000 sheep. The house was inherited by his widow Abundia García de Barela (c. 1849–1943), who owned the property until her death. In the twentieth century, it was the residence of Robert Dietz III (c. 1915–1991), whose previous home is also a listed historic property. The Barela–Bledsoe House was listed on the New Mexico State Register of Cultural Properties in 1976 and the National Register of Historic Places in 1979.

The house is a one-story, L-shaped building wrapping around the north and east sides of a placita or courtyard; a former wing enclosing the west side of the courtyard is no longer extant. The two remaining wings are joined by a zaguan, a covered passageway opening onto the placita. A portal or portico is attached to the east side of the house. The walls are 22 inches (56 cm) thick and are constructed from terrones (sod bricks) set on a stone foundation. The house has Territorial-style details including wooden door and window trim with pedimented, dentil-patterned lintels. The east wing contains seven rooms with 13-foot (4.0 m) ceilings supported by milled beams, an adaptation of the traditional viga and latilla roof using more modern construction methods. A second zaguan through the center of the east wing has been closed off to form a hallway. The north wing houses a separate apartment and a garage.
