= Robert Edwin Dietz =

American lantern maker

Robert E. Dietz (1818–1897) was the founder of the R. E. Dietz Company.

At the age of 22, he purchased a lamp and oil business at 62 Fulton Street in Brooklyn, New York, where he manufactured candle lanterns. In 1842, he and his brother formed Dietz, Brother & Company. They were awarded the lighting contract for the P.T. Barnun premier of Jenny Lind in 1850 and they manufactured camphene lamps, solar lamps, girandoles, hall lamps and chandeliers.

In 1869, Robert Dietz formed the R. E. Dietz Company.

By the 1890s, he had become the top lantern maker in the United States. He died in 1897.
