= Foster Hall (Las Cruces, New Mexico) =

- U.S. National Register of Historic Places
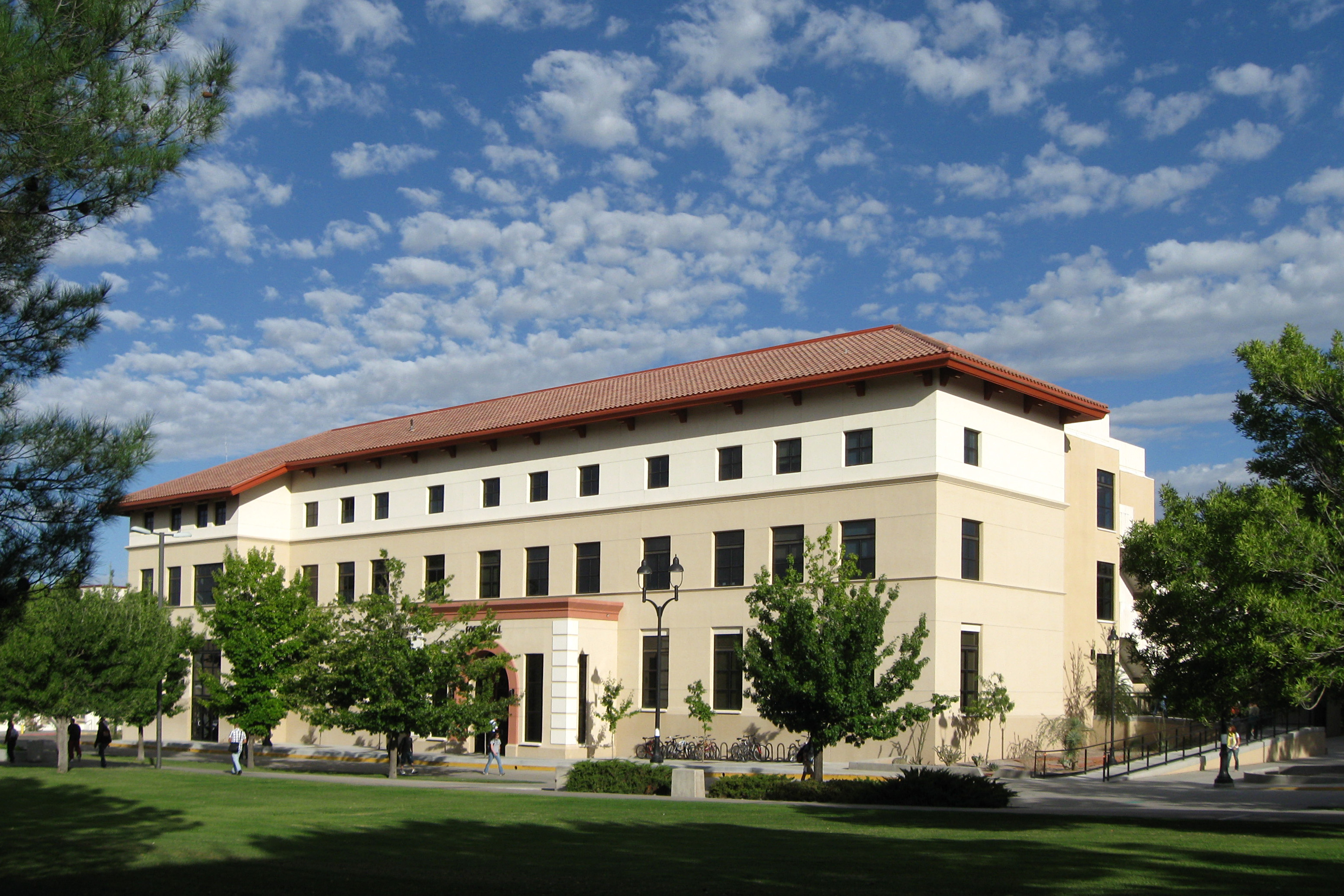
- Foster Hall in 2009

- Location within New Mexico
- Location: SE corner of S. Horseshoe and Sweet, NMSU, Las Cruces, New Mexico
- Coordinates: 32°16′53″N 106°45′09″W
- Area: 0.7 acres (0.28 ha)
- Built: 1930
- Architect: Braunton & McGhee
- Architectural style: Spanish Colonial Revival, Baroque Revival
- MPS: New Mexico Campus Buildings Built 1906--1937 TR
- NRHP reference No.: 88001547
- Added to NRHP: May 16, 1989

Foster Hall is a historic building on the campus of New Mexico State University in Las Cruces, New Mexico. It was built in 1930 to add more classrooms on campus, and it was named for a former professor, Luther Foster, who served as NMSU's president from 1901 to 1908. The building was designed by Braunton & McGhee in the Spanish Colonial Revival and Baroque Revival architectural styles. It has been listed on the National Register of Historic Places since May 16, 1989.
