= Ortiz House (Yuma, Arizona) =

Historic house in Arizona, United States

- U.S. National Register of Historic Places
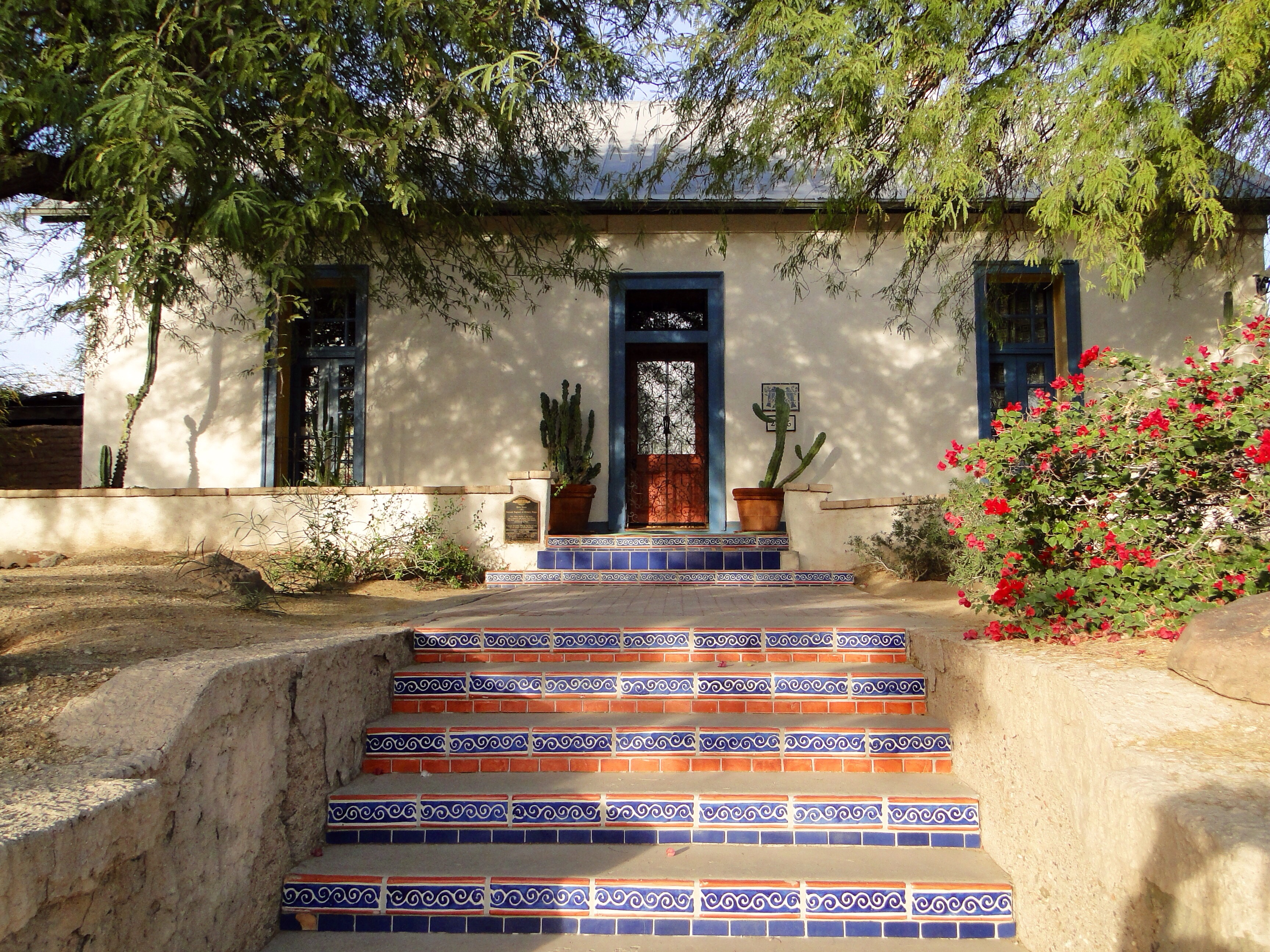

- Location within Arizona Location within the United States
- Location: 206 S. 1st Ave., Yuma, Arizona
- Coordinates: 32°43′23″N 114°37′13″W
- Built: 1901
- Architect: Ortiz, G.A.
- Architectural style: Anglicized Sonoran
- MPS: Yuma MRA
- NRHP reference No.: 82001650
- Added to NRHP: December 7, 1982

Ortiz House in Yuma, Arizona was built in 1901. It was listed on the National Register of Historic Places in 1982.

Along with the Polhamus House and the G.W. Norton House, the Ortiz House demonstrates an evolution of house plans in Yuma, by showing "a zaguan configuration with two rows of rooms opening off of a central hall."

== See also ==
- List of historic properties in Yuma, Arizona
- National Register of Historic Places listings in Yuma County, Arizona
