= L.B. Bentley General Merchandise =

- Bentley, L.B., General Merchandise
- U.S. National Register of Historic Places
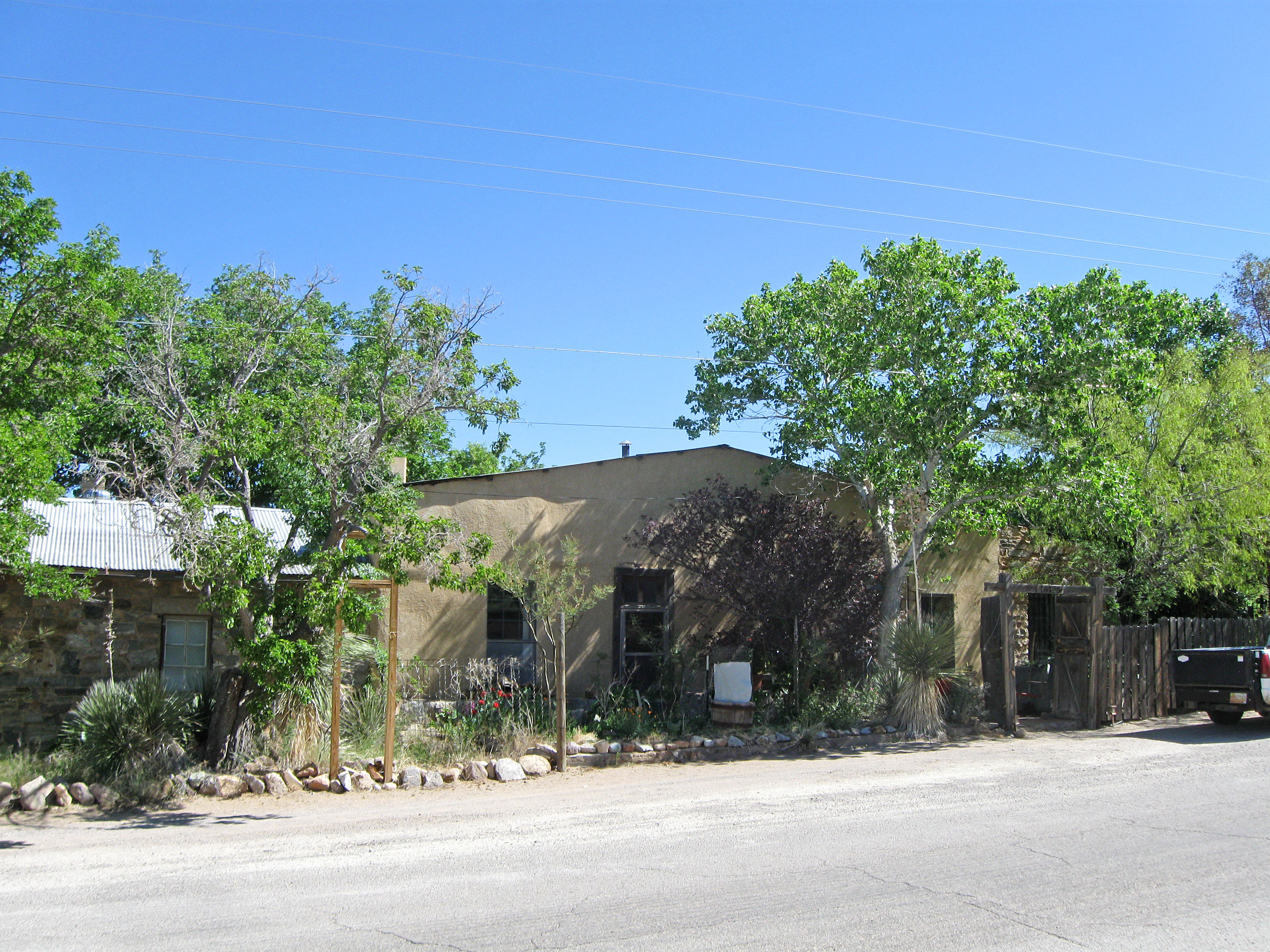

- Location within New Mexico
- Location: 16125 Old Organ Main St., Organ, New Mexico
- Coordinates: 32°25′40″N 106°35′55″W
- Area: less than one acre
- Built: 1902
- NRHP reference No.: 06000155
- Added to NRHP: March 22, 2006

L.B. Bentley General Merchandise, at 16125 Old Organ Main St. in Organ, New Mexico, was built in 1902. It was listed on the National Register of Historic Places in 2006. The listing included three contributing buildings and three contributing structures.

The main building, which also served as the Organ Custom Assay Office, was built of adobe and stone during 1884 to 1909.
