= Zaguan =

Exterior passageway used in Mexican and Southwestern U.S. architecture

Zaguan refers to a house plan configuration where a central passageway leads from a front door to a patio or a courtyard. This is found in historic houses in Mexico and in the southwestern United States. Usually rooms are one deep, with each facing the street or the courtyard. "Zaguan" may properly refer to the passageway, but sometimes refers to the complex as a whole.

A zaguán is a space immediately before, or behind the front door of a house or palace that serves as a vestibule to the main entrance. It is often covered, but otherwise open to the elements, and provides direct access from the street to the central courtyard beyond. Being partly outdoors, and at street level, it is frequently used like a mud room, and to stow carriages or cars, or access the service area without going through the house. The zaguán is common, especially in traditional houses and other buildings, throughout Spain and all Hispanic countries. The word comes from the Arabic "istawán" or "usṭuwān[ah]."

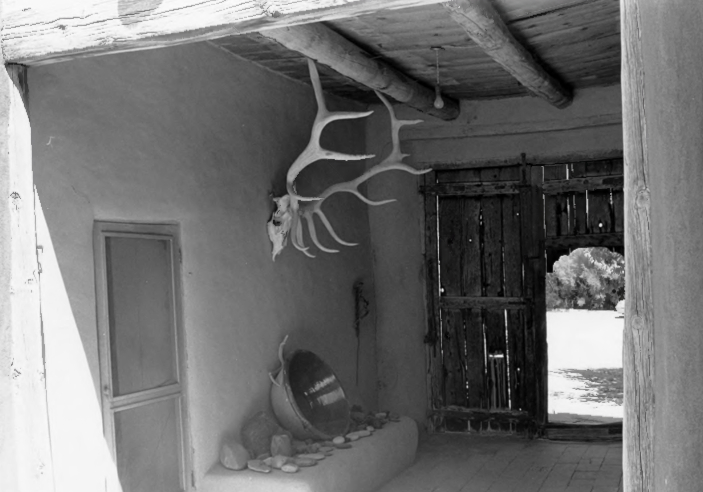
Zaguan at Georgia O'Keeffe House

Examples include:

- Ortiz House in Yuma, Arizona
- Georgia O'Keeffe Home and Studio, Abiquiú, New Mexico.
- Salvador Armijo House
- Barela–Bledsoe House
- Barela-Reynolds House
- El Zaguan, Santa Fe, New Mexico
- Gutiérrez Hubbell House, Albuquerque, New Mexico
