= Frank and Amelia Jones House =

- U.S. National Register of Historic Places
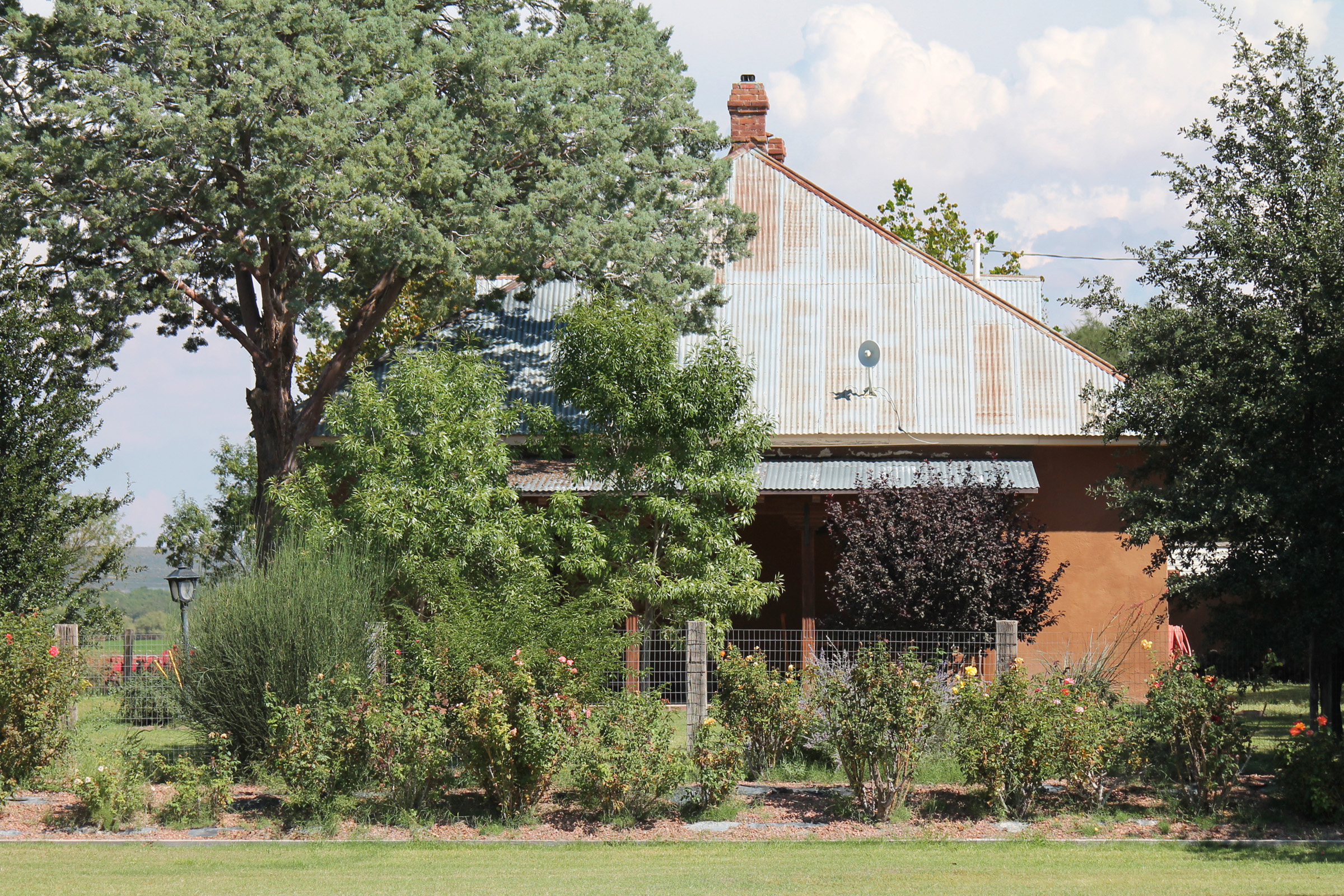

- Location within New Mexico
- Location: 18000 Castillo Rd., La Mesa, New Mexico
- Coordinates: 32°08′42″N 106°43′02″W
- Built: c.1904
- NRHP reference No.: 14000444
- Added to NRHP: July 25, 2014

Frank and Amelia Jones House, at 18000 Castillo Rd. in La Mesa, New Mexico, was built around 1904. It was listed on the National Register of Historic Places in 2014.

It has also been known as Martinez-Hernandez Farm and as Ness House.

It is a one-story 33 by 63 feet (10 m × 19 m) adobe house with a high hipped roof.
