= Mesilla Park Elementary School =

- U.S. National Register of Historic Places
- U.S. Historic district – Contributing property
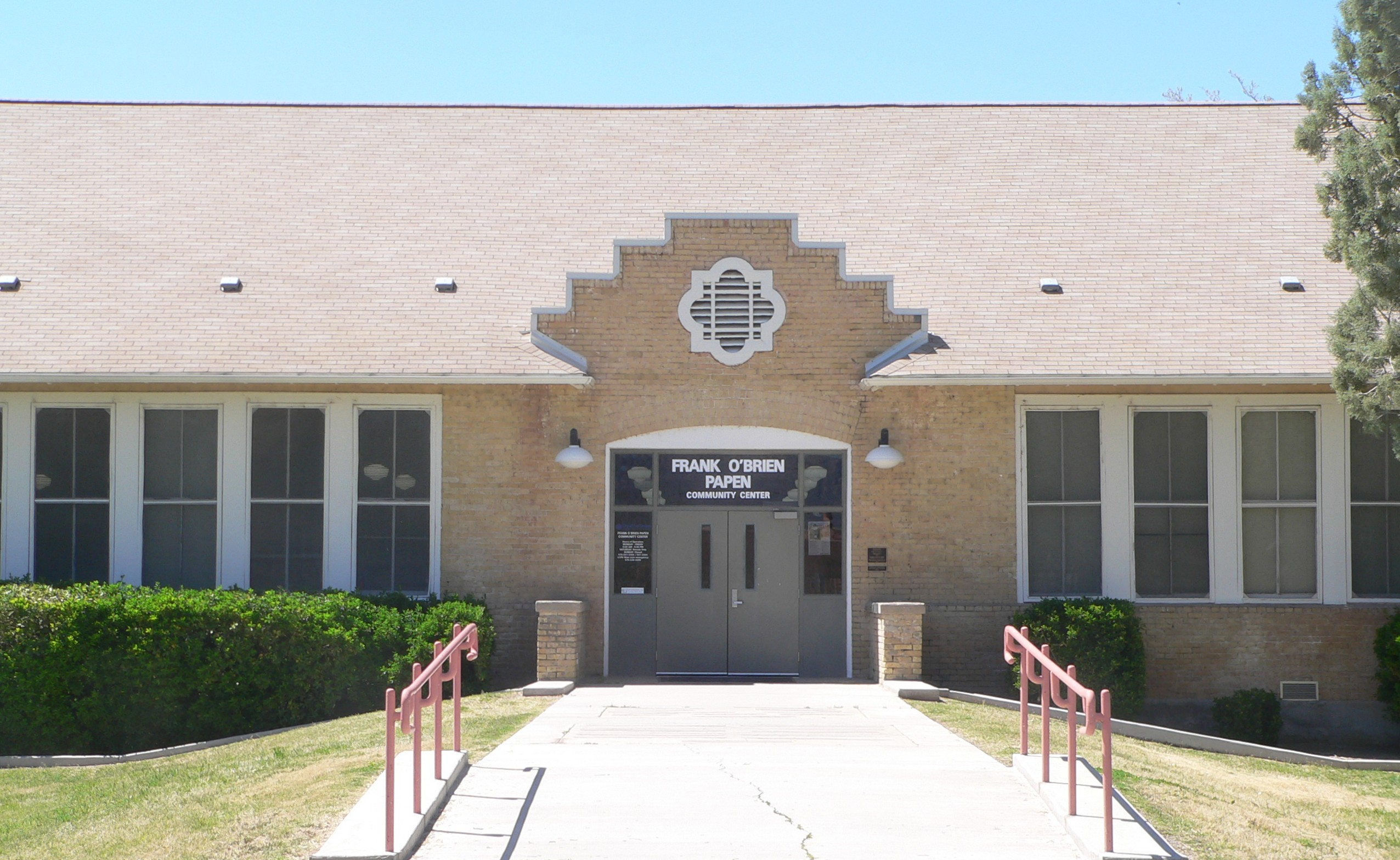

- Location within New Mexico
- Location: 304 Bell Ave., Las Cruces, New Mexico
- Coordinates: 32°16′30″N 106°46′10″W
- Built: 1907, 1934, 1963
- Architect: Henry Trost
- Architectural style: Mission/Spanish Revival
- Part of: Mesilla Park Historic District (ID16000161)
- NRHP reference No.: 15000039

Significant dates
- Added to NRHP: February 23, 2015
- Designated CP: April 12, 2016

Mesilla Park Elementary School is a public school in Las Cruces, New Mexico, which was listed on the National Register of Historic Places in 2015.

The New Mexico Historic Preservation Commission stated that "The school is notable for its brick construction and its numerous additions built between 1916-1963 as the agricultural valley saw rapid growth because of its pecan orchards and other crops, and the growth of New Mexico State University Mesilla Park Elementary began as a one-room adobe school house in 1901."

It also is a contributing building in the 2016-listed Mesilla Park Historic District.

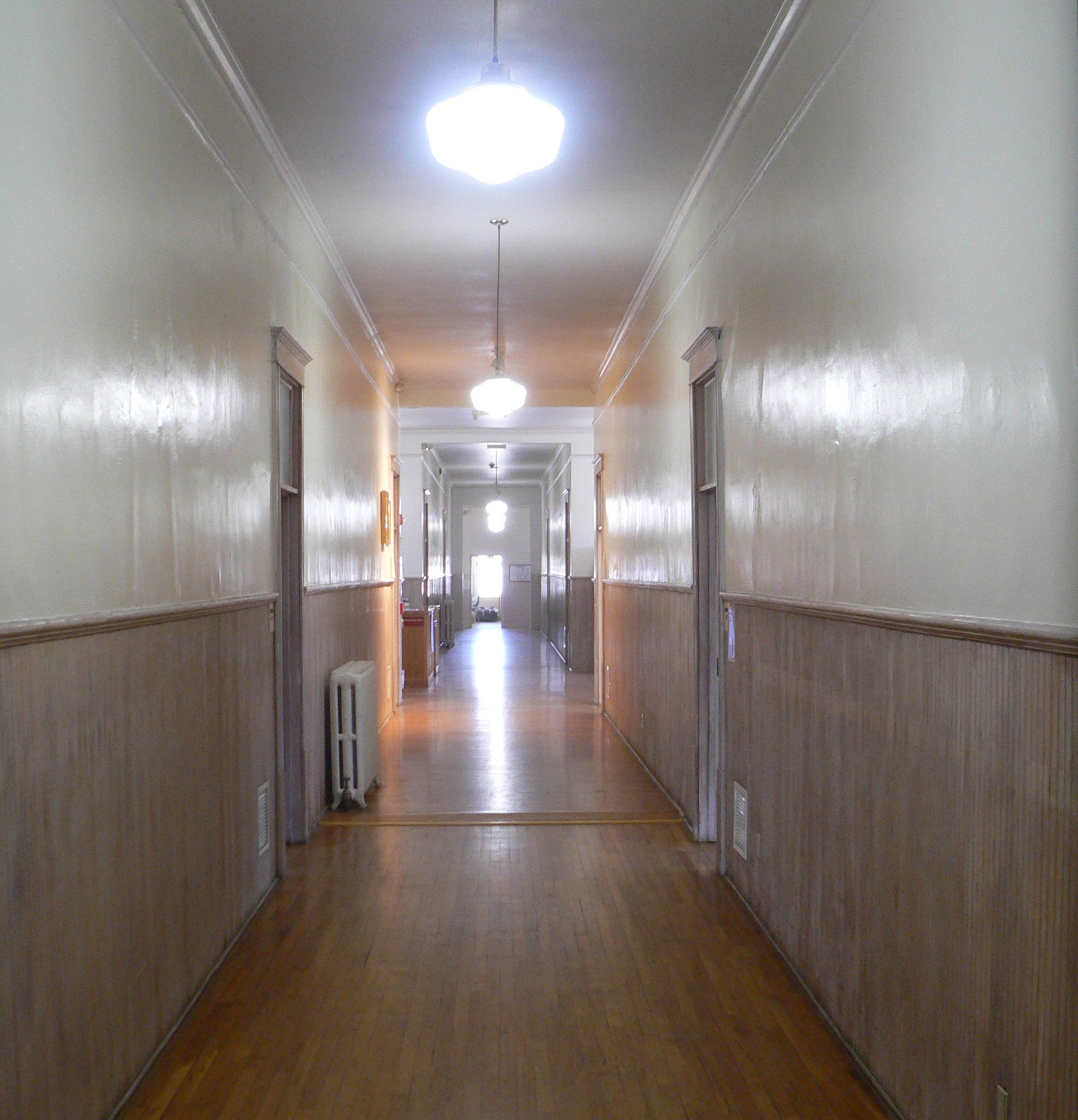

It is now the Frank O'Brien Papen Community Center.

It was built, beginning in 1907, in the new Bowman Addition development.

"The Mesilla Park Elementary School is a large, sprawling, one-story school building (photo 32). Designed by Henry Trost and built in 1907, the school is a Spanish Mission Revival-style building with decorative pediment above the main entrance. The brick building was covered with a hipped roof and included four classrooms. As the student population increased, a series of additions were added beginning in 1916 with two additions on the north and south ends to accommodate four additional classrooms and an auditorium on the rear (west) side of the building. In 1934, classroom additions were again added to the north and south ends of the school. In 1943, a new, larger auditorium, which seats 400 students, was built on the west end of the 1934 auditorium. Lastly, in 1963, a cafeteria was built on the southwest side of the roughly T-shaped building."

== See also ==
- La Mesilla, New Mexico
- La Mesilla Historic District
