= Paul Laurence Dunbar Elementary School =

Coordinates: 32°7′5.5″N 106°39′46″W

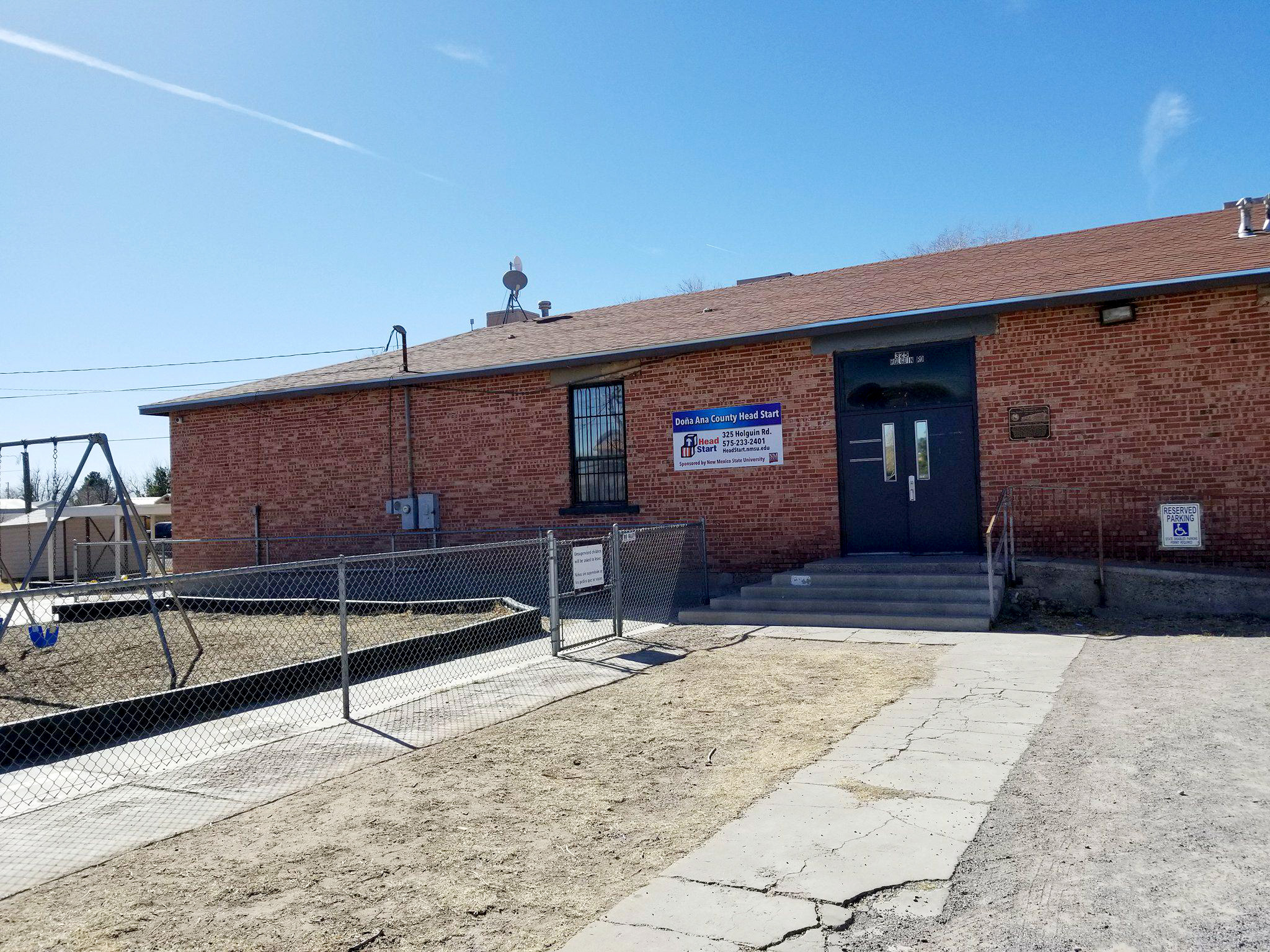

Location
- 325 Holguin Road; Vado, Doña Ana County, New Mexico 75061; United States

Information
- Type: Public, Elementary
- Established: 1926
- Closed: 1957
- School district: Gadsden School District
- Principal: Giels B. Grimes
- Grades: 1–8
- Enrollment: 175 (2014-15)
- Campus: Rural

The Paul Laurence Dunbar Elementary School is a rectangular brick elementary school, which was built by Doña Ana County in 1926 after the school board chose to racially segregate its public schools. The Dunbar School is located on the south side of Vado in the Lower Rio Grande Valley between the river and Interstate 25, roughly fifteen miles south of Las Cruces. It was listed on the National Register of Historic Places in 2017.

When the school formally opened on February 10, 1926, it taught elementary and high school students. Later, students travelled to Las Cruces for high school at the segregated Booker T. Washington School, which was built on Solano Street in 1934. When the Supreme Court handed down the Brown v. Board decision in 1954, it was with the proviso that states desegregate their schools “with all deliberate speed.” In the South, most schools were not desegregated until 1970. Compliance with the Brown ruling came much faster in New Mexico. The last class at Dunbar Elementary School graduated in 1957 before they integrated the Gadsden District.
