= Alameda-Depot Historic District =

Historic district in New Mexico, United States

- U.S. National Register of Historic Places
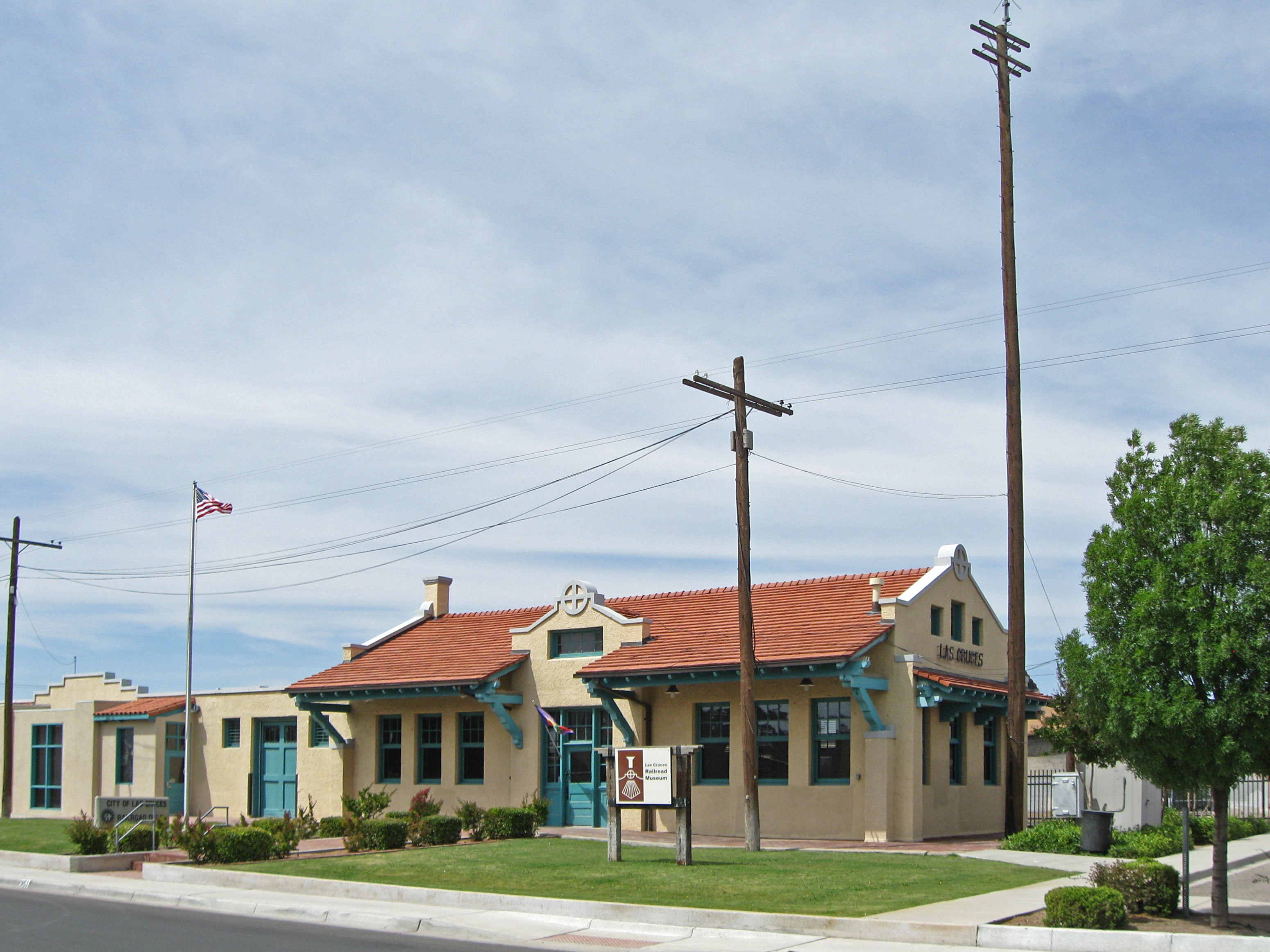
- Las Cruces New Mexico Railroad Museum

- Location within New Mexico
- Location: Includes properties centered around Pioneer Women's Park and extending up Alameda Blvd., Las Cruces, New Mexico
- Coordinates: 32°18′45″N 106°47′01″W
- Area: 70 acres (28 ha)
- Built: 1881
- Architect: Multiple
- Architectural style: Late 19th and 20th Century Revivals, Late Victorian, Mission/spanish Revival
- NRHP reference No.: 85000786
- Added to NRHP: April 11, 1985

The Alameda-Depot Historic District, in Las Cruces, New Mexico, is a historic district which was listed on the National Register of Historic Places in 1985. The listing included 271 contributing buildings and a contributing site, on 70 acres (28 ha).

It has also been known as the Las Cruces Depot-Alameda Historic District.

It includes properties centered around Pioneer Women's Park and extending up Alameda Boulevard, in an area of about 42 blocks.

Year of construction: 1881.

Architecture: Late 19th And 20th Century Revivals, Late Victorian, Mission/Spanish Revival.

Historic function: Domestic; Commerce/trade.

Historic subfunction: Single Dwelling; Secondary Structure; Business.

Criteria: event, architecture/engineering.

It includes the Las Cruces New Mexico Railroad Museum.
