= Chope's Town Cafe and Bar =

- U.S. National Register of Historic Places
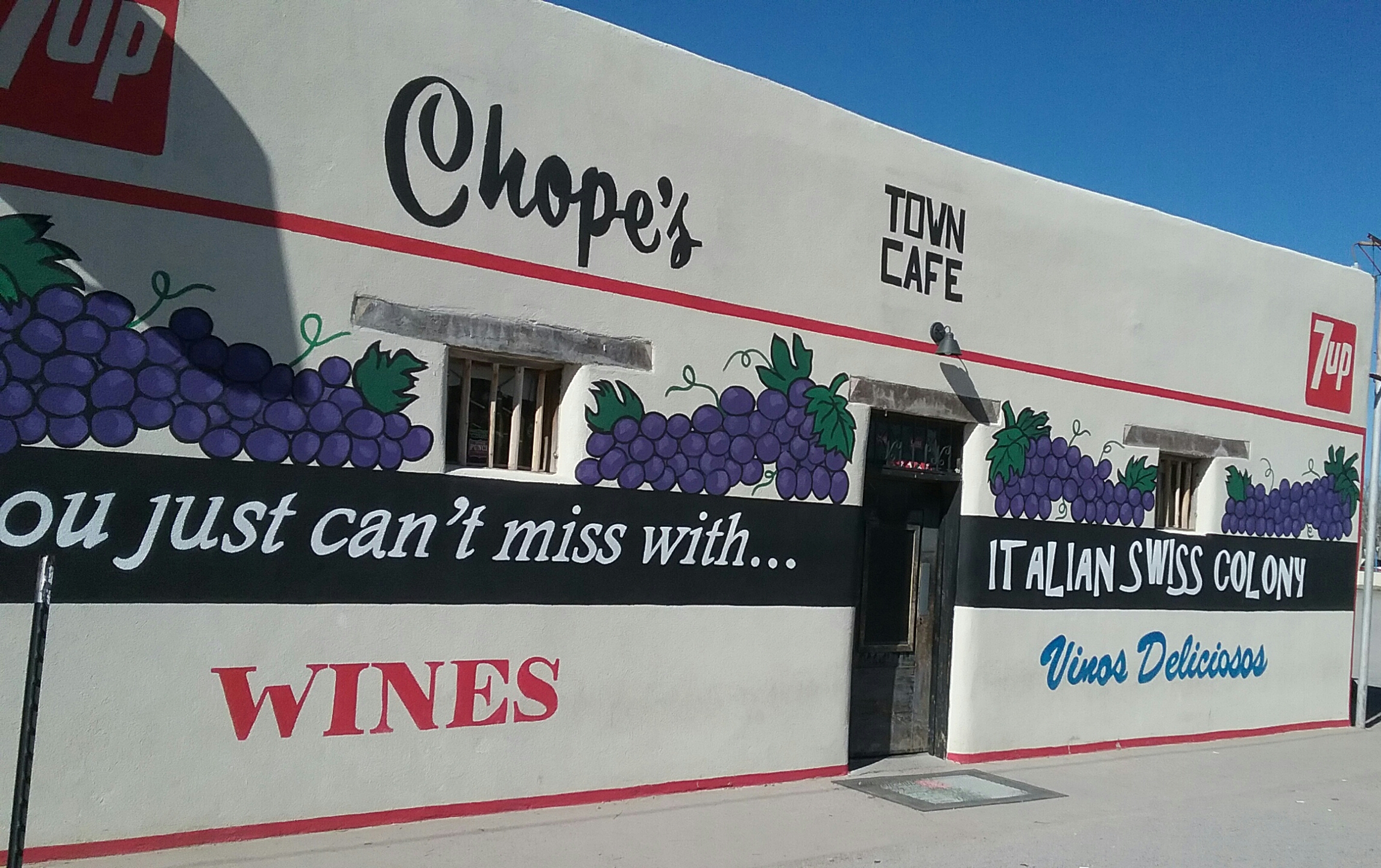

- Location within New Mexico
- Location: 16145 NM 28, La Mesa, New Mexico
- Coordinates: 32°07′10″N 106°42′22″W
- NRHP reference No.: 15000262
- Added to NRHP: May 26, 2015

Chope's Town Cafe and Bar, in La Mesa, New Mexico, was listed on the National Register of Historic Places in 2015.

It was established as a restaurant in 1915 by Longina and Margarito Benavides, when Longina began selling her enchiladas to locals. It was named for José "Chope" Benavides, their son, who took over in the 1940s. He wore chopos (overalls) often.

It was founded by Chope and Lupe Benavidez.

It is located at 16145 New Mexico State Road 28.
