= Mesilla Park Historic District =

Historic district in New Mexico, United States

- U.S. National Register of Historic Places
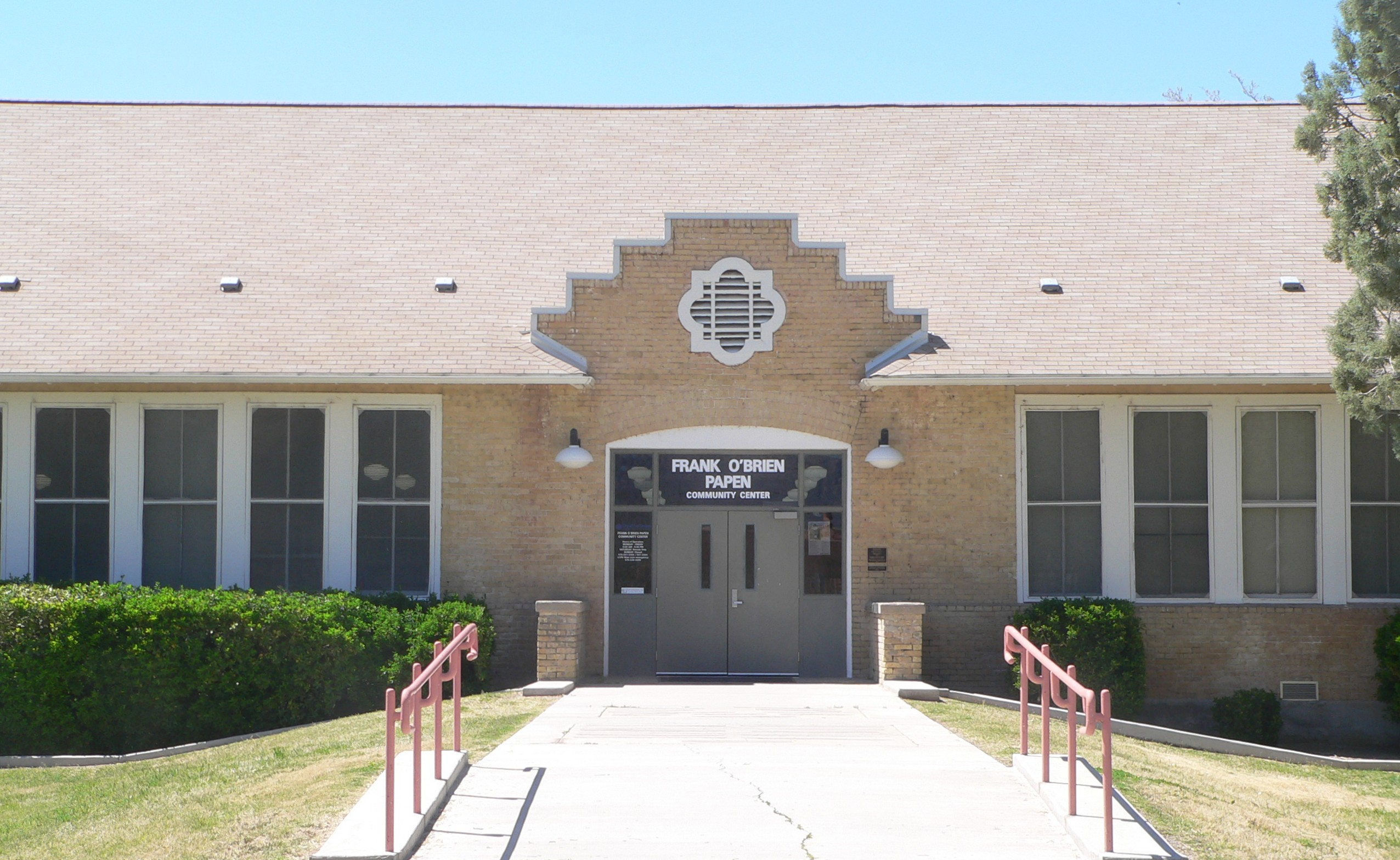
- Frank O'Brien Papen Community Center, occupying the former Mesilla Park Elementary School, at 304 Bell Avenue (west corner of Bell and Linden Avenues) in Las Cruces, New Mexico. Center of front (northeast side) of building, which faces Linden.

- Location within New Mexico
- Location: Bounded by Bowman St., Union and University Aves., and Park Drain, Las Cruces, New Mexico
- Coordinates: 32°16′38″N 106°46′08″W
- Area: 184 acres (74 ha)
- Architectural style: Mission/spanish Revival, Territorial
- NRHP reference No.: 16000161
- Added to NRHP: April 12, 2016

The Mesilla Park Historic District, in Las Cruces, New Mexico, is a historic district which was listed on the National Register of Historic Places in 2016. The listing included 131 contributing buildings and two contributing structures on 184 acres (74 ha).

It is roughly bounded by Bowman St., Union and University Aves., and Park Drain.

The district includes:

- Mesilla Park Elementary School (1907-1963), separately listed on the National Register in 2015
- a railroad depot (1925)
- St. James Episcopal Church (1911)

== See also ==
- La Mesilla, New Mexico
- La Mesilla Historic District
