= Robert Dietz Farmhouse =

Historic house in New Mexico, United States

- U.S. National Register of Historic Places
- NM State Register of Cultural Properties
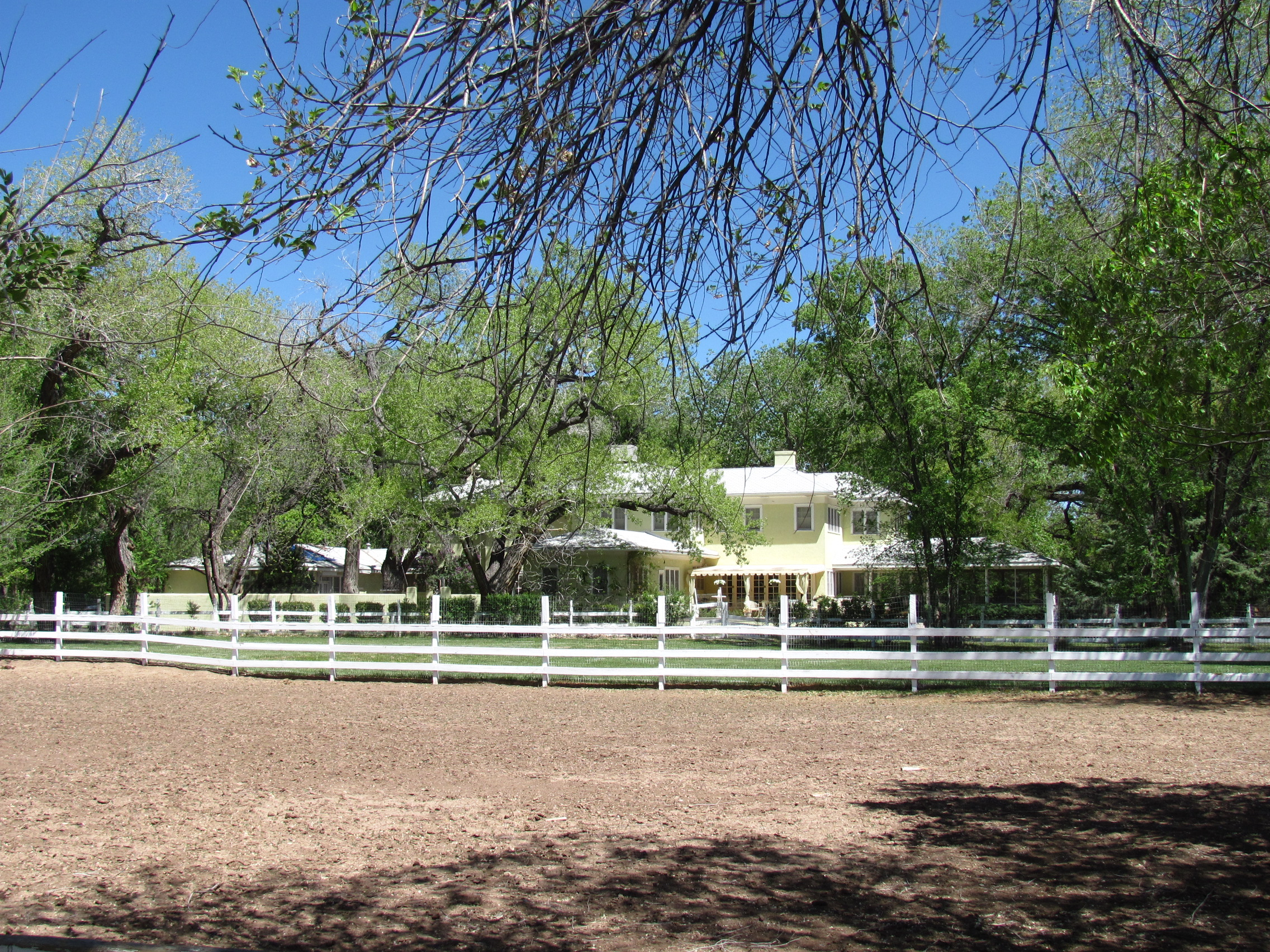
- Dietz Farmhouse, 2010

- Location within New Mexico Location within the United States
- Location: 4117 Rio Grande Blvd. NW, Albuquerque, New Mexico
- Coordinates: 35°8′23″N 106°40′44″W
- Built: 1914
- Architectural style: Prairie School
- NRHP reference No.: 84002852
- NMSRCP No.: 946

Significant dates
- Added to NRHP: February 9, 1984
- Designated NMSRCP: August 25, 1983

The Robert Dietz Farmhouse is a historic house in the North Valley of Albuquerque, New Mexico. It was originally a one-story farmhouse built in 1914 by Robert Dietz, a native of Syracuse, New York, who moved to Albuquerque in 1910 like many others seeking treatment for tuberculosis. A second story was added in 1928, turning the building into a "grand home". The Dietz family lived and farmed there until the 1940s. It was listed on the New Mexico State Register of Cultural Properties in 1983 and the National Register of Historic Places in 1984.

The Dietz house is a two-story stuccoed frame building aligned along a north–south axis. The house design is a vernacular adaptation of Prairie School architecture, with a low, overhanging hip roof, and sash windows arranged in bands surrounded by wooden trim to "create an impression of horizontality". The house has over 100 windows in total. A stable on the property is also included in the National Register listing.
