= Doña Ana, New Mexico =

- Census-designated place
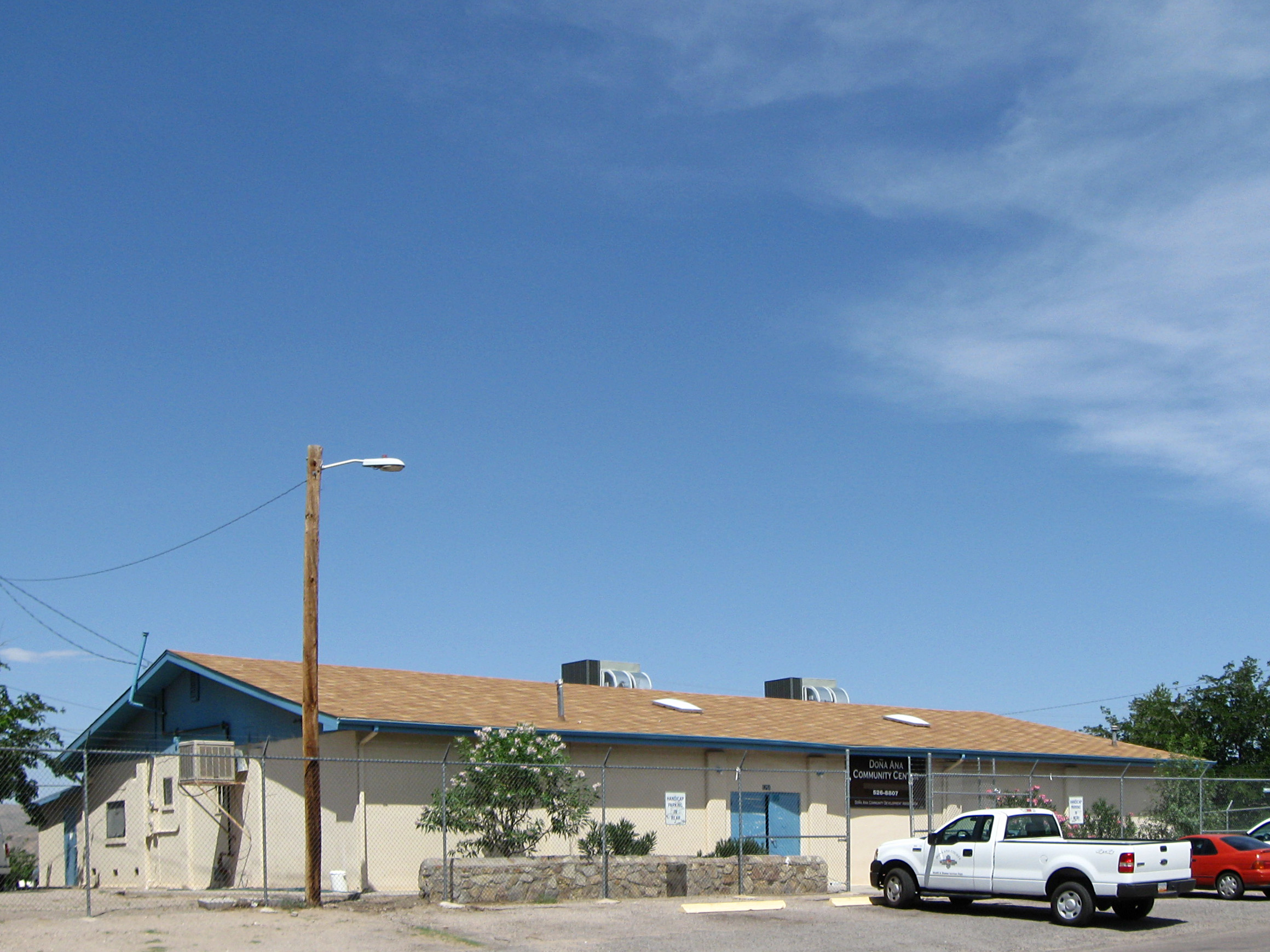
- Doña Ana Community Center, July 2009

- Location within Doña Ana County and New Mexico
- Coordinates: 32°23′38″N 106°49′04″W
- Country: United States
- State: New Mexico
- County: Doña Ana

Area
  - Total: 0.64 sq mi (1.65 km^{2})
  - Land: 0.64 sq mi (1.65 km^{2})
  - Water: 0 sq mi (0.00 km^{2})
- Elevation: 3,963 ft (1,208 m)

Population (2020)
  - Total: 874
  - Density: 1,368.5/sq mi (528.38/km^{2})
- Time zone: Mountain (MST)
- ZIP code: 88032
- Area code: 575
- FIPS code: 35-21110
- GNIS feature ID: 2408681

Doña Ana is a census-designated place (CDP) in Doña Ana County, New Mexico, United States. As of the 2020 census, Doña Ana had a population of 874.

== History ==
Doña Ana is named for Doña Ana Robledo, who died there in 1680 while fleeing the Pueblo Revolt. In 1846, the British traveler George Frederick Ruxton passed through Doña Ana near the eastern bank of the Rio Grande River. He said, "Doña Ana is a very recent settlement of ten or fifteen families, who, tempted by the richness of the soil, abandoned their farms in the valley of El Paso, and have here attempted to cultivate a small tract of land in the very midst of the Apaches, who have already paid them several visits and carried off or destroyed their stock of cattle. The huts are built of log and mud, and situated on the top of a tabular bluff which looks down upon the river bottom".

== Geography ==
Doña Ana is located near the center of Doña Ana County. Interstate 25 forms the eastern edge of the CDP, with access from Exit 9. I-25 leads south 6 miles (10 km) to Las Cruces and northwest 33 miles (53 km) to Hatch.

According to the United States Census Bureau, the CDP has a total area of 0.66 square miles (1.7 km^{2}), all land.

== Demographics ==
Historical population
Census	Pop.	Note	%±
2020	874		—
U.S. Decennial Census

Doña Ana is part of the Las Cruces Metropolitan Statistical Area.

As of the census of 2000, there were 1,379 people, 447 households, and 363 families residing in the CDP. The population density was 1,885.3 inhabitants per square mile (727.9/km^{2}). There were 465 housing units at an average density of 635.7 per square mile (245.4/km^{2}). The racial makeup of the CDP was 45.76% White, 0.44% Black or African American, 1.67% Native American, 0.51% Asian, 47.14% from other races, and 4.50% from two or more races. Hispanic or Latino of any race were 87.09% of the population.

There were 447 households, out of which 39.8% had children under the age of 18 living with them, 55.9% were married couples living together, 17.9% had a female householder with no husband present, and 18.6% were non-families. 16.3% of all households were made up of individuals, and 5.6% had someone living alone who was 65 years of age or older. The average household size was 3.09 and the average family size was 3.43.

In the CDP, the population was spread out, with 30.5% under the age of 18, 11.4% from 18 to 24, 27.6% from 25 to 44, 21.5% from 45 to 64, and 9.1% who were 65 years of age or older. The median age was 31 years. For every 100 females there were 98.4 males. For every 100 females age 18 and over, there were 94.1 males.

The median income for a household in the CDP was $27,292, and the median income for a family was $32,685. Males had a median income of $18,295 versus $13,047 for females. The per capita income for the CDP was $10,542. About 17.8% of families and 22.8% of the population were below the poverty line, including 26.5% of those under age 18 and 44.2% of those age 65 or over.

== Education ==
It is located in Las Cruces Public Schools.

== See also ==
- List of census-designated places in New Mexico
