= Veronica Hughart =

Artist, architectural designer and journalist (1907–1977)

- Born: 1907; Idaho, U.S.
- Died: 1977 (aged 69–70); Tucson, Arizona
- Known for: Architectural design and painting
- Movement: Abstract Expressionism, Sonoran Revival

Annie Verona "Veronica" Barry Hughart (1907–1977) was an artist, architectural designer and journalist who lived in Tucson, Arizona and was an active part of the Old Fort Lowell art colony.

== Life ==
Hughart was born in Idaho to Ernest Zimmerman Barry and Annie Lee Frazelle. She attended school in North Carolina and lived in Illinois and Connecticut. In 1931, she married John Harding Page. She moved to a ranch near Willcox, Arizona in 1943. She purchased and operated the H Cross guest ranch near Bonita before moving to Tucson in 1951.

In 1954, Hughart purchased a three-room adobe shell on Fort Lowell Road. With her twin sons; Peter, and author Barry Hughart, she transformed the structure into what was called in the Arizona Daily Star in 1957, “a small house of unusual charm, conveniently compact while suggesting spaciousness. The paper described her work as [adapting] traditional ideas to meet a particular need [...] making what she needs from what she has at hand.” The Japanese-inspired garden of her Fort Lowell home was designed by Tucson modernist sculptor and artist Charles Clement.

Hughart was an unabashed enthusiast about Arizona-Sonoran indigenous architecture and building materials. In the early 1950s, she wrote a nationally syndicated newspaper column called "What A Women Thinks". She studied architecture and designed or remodeled more than thirty Tucson houses between 1956 and her death. Hughart died in Tucson, Arizona in 1977.

== Works ==
- Veronica Hughart House, c. 1957, (Old Fort Lowell) 5309 E. Fort Lowell Road, Tucson
- Calle San Francisco House, 1957, 2820 N. Torino, Tucson.
- Joesler-Loerpabel House Addition, c. 1958: Josias Joesler 2nd House. W. H. Loerpabels Addition, 306 N Longfellow Ave., Tucson
- S. Bayard Colgate House, c. 1959, (Tucson, Arizona) Published in Sunset Magazine, 1963.
- James F. Eager Speculative House, 1959, 4100 N. Avenida Cazador, Flecha Caida Estates, Tucson, Arizona
- John H. Jansen House, c. 1960 (Tucson, Arizona)
- Daniel Davis House Addition, (Tucson, Arizona) 1963
- Nora Pickrell House, (Tucson, Arizona) c. 1965
- Barton Cross House, Cloud Road (Tucson, Arizona) 1969
- Henry Hitchcock House, East Miramar Drive, Tucson Country Club, (Tucson, Arizona) 1972
- Germaine Cheruy and René Cheruy House Additions (Old Fort Lowell), 3031 N. Craycroft, Tucson
