= Fort Lowell Union Church =

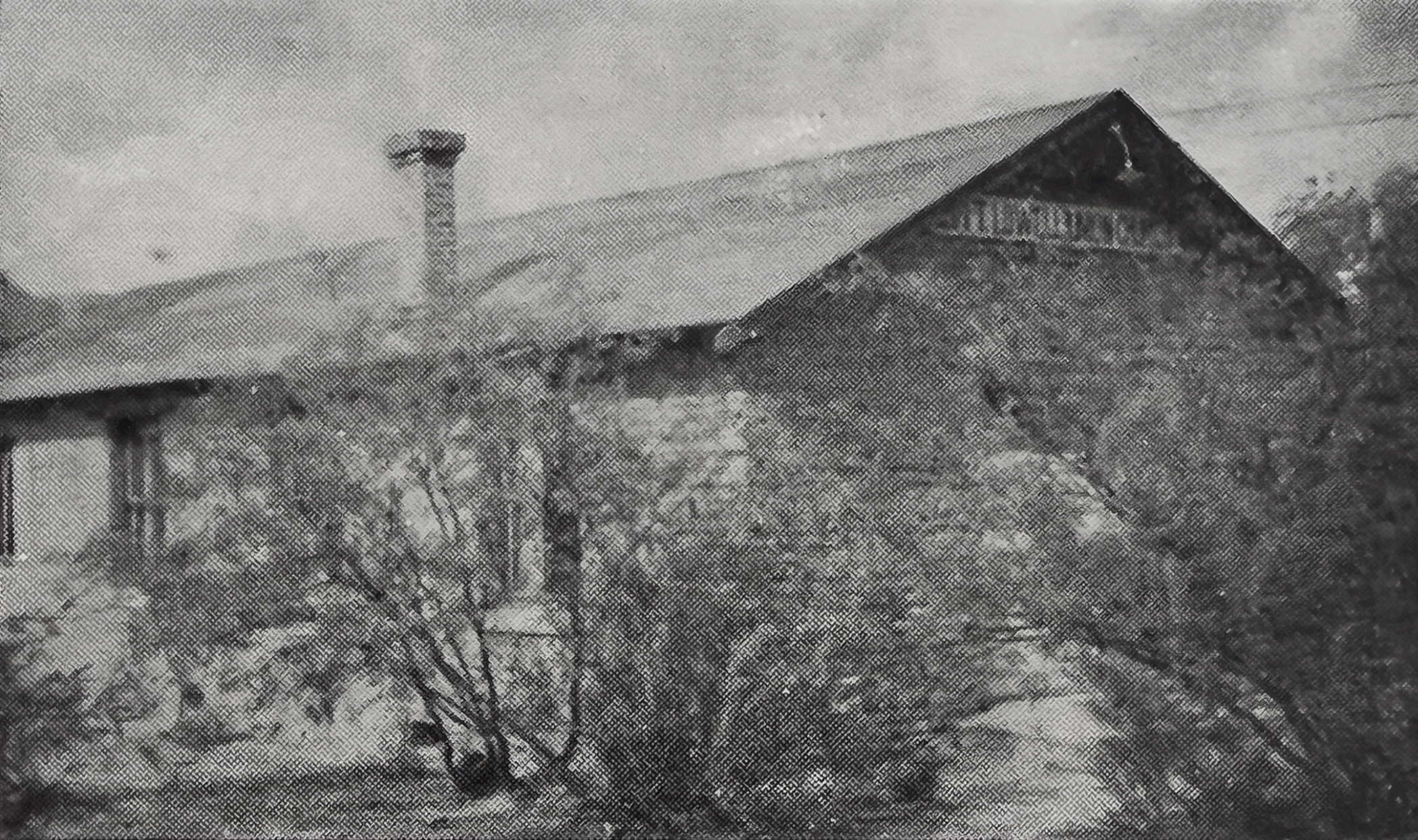
- Fort Lowell Union Church, 1917
- Location: 5215 E Fort Lowell Rd, Tucson, Arizona
- Area: .79 acres (0.32 ha)
- Built: 1917
- Architectural style: Sonoran Transitional Territorial

Fort Lowell Union Church, located in the Old Fort Lowell neighborhood of Tucson, in the U.S. state of Arizona, was constructed in 1917 from mud adobe. It served as a religious, cultural, and social hub for the local ranching and farming community. The building, designed in a late Sonoran Transitional Territorial style, is simple yet artistic and became a centerpiece in the historic area of Fort Lowell in the early to mid 20th century, fostering community engagement and spiritual growth for over a century.

== History and founding ==
The idea for the Fort Lowell Union Church was spearheaded by Edward C. Clark, an Anglican lay reader at Grace Episcopal Church and associated with St. Luke's Home. Clark envisioned creating a community church (part of the Community Church movement) in the rural Fort Lowell area, and by 1916, he had raised $1,000 to begin the construction. On April 1, 1917, construction of the small adobe chapel began. The property was donated by J. Knox Corbett, a prominent local figure who owned the nearby farm, and the funds to build the church were raised by the local community.

The original church building measured 20 x 40 feet and faced south, with its entrance directed toward the Roman Catholic Chapel of Rillito (San Angel de la Guarda Chapel) (later rebuilt after a tornado as San Pedro Chapel), which had been consecrated in 1916. The Union Church and the Catholic chapel, along with the 1913 Fort Lowell School, adobe houses, and a store, helped form the informal plaza known as El Fuerte. The church trustees included J.C. Daly, Franklin Ulrich, and E. C. H. Walker.

== Building and architecture ==
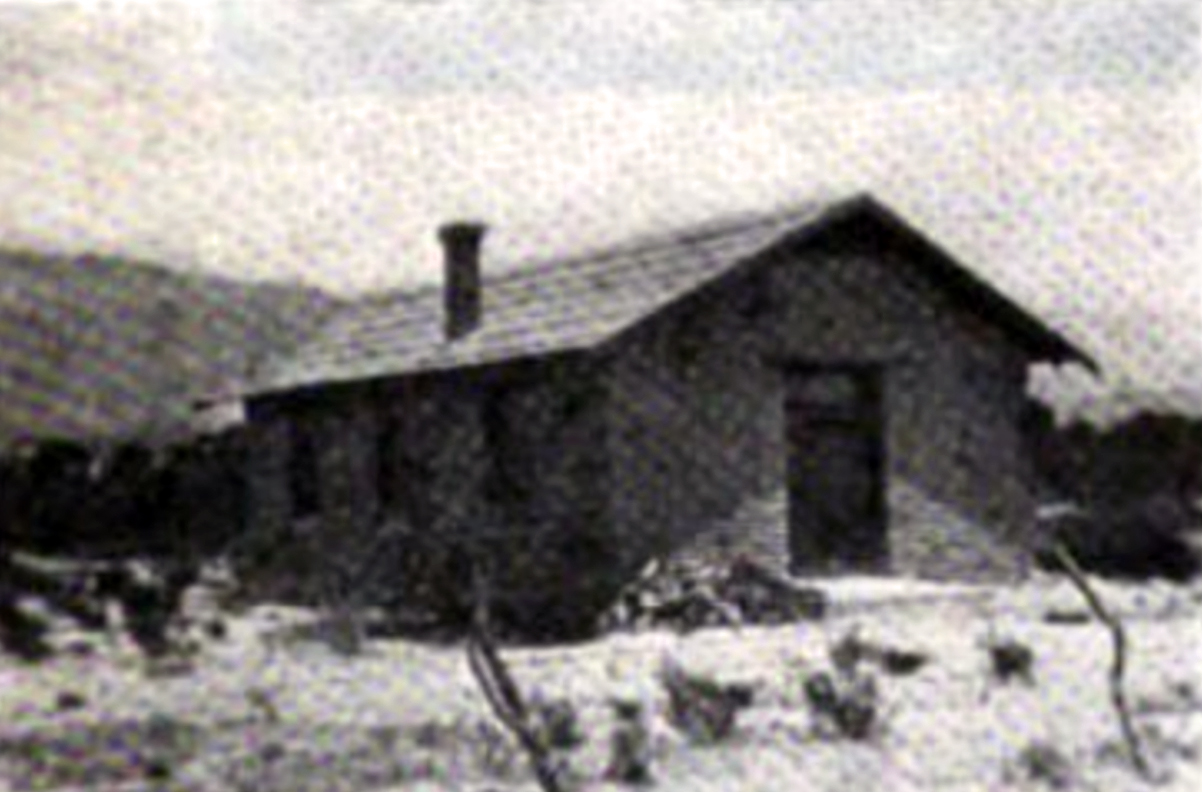
Fort Lowell Union Church, 1919

The Fort Lowell Union Church was constructed from traditional mud adobe, a common building material in the American Southwest and in Fort Lowell, known for its thermal insulation properties. The church featured a rectangular plan with a double front door facing south. The building's design included a pitched roof with exposed rafter tails, a prominent brick chimney on the west side, and double hung divided four light sash windows, on the east and west sides of the structure. Over time, the church underwent several modifications, including a mud adobe western addition (c. 1920/25) for a hall and support rooms, and a plastered exterior with a front porch added after World War II.

== Dedication ceremony ==
The church was completed and officially dedicated on June 24, 1917, with around 100 people in attendance. During the ceremony, Edward C. Clark offered a dedication prayer, and various clergy from Tucson churches, including Revs Clifford Binkhorst, Dixon, Comstock, and Purves, participated. John C. Daly, one of the trustees, donated a bas-relief of the San Xavier Mission, symbolizing the missionary principle. The pulpit used during services was a historic piece, having been gifted by the congregation of the old Congregational Church in Tucson.

== Community role ==
The Fort Lowell Union Church quickly became a social center for the local community. It hosted musical programs, lectures, and events, organized by Clark, and became a gathering place for religious and intellectual activities. During World War I, the church supported Red Cross lectures, contributing to the war effort by educating the public.

In the 1930s, the church remained a vital part of the Fort Lowell community. Social events like Democratic rallies and fairs were held at the church, while local organizations, including the Palo Verde Mission Choir and the Homemakers Club, used the space for their meetings.

== Mission church tradition ==
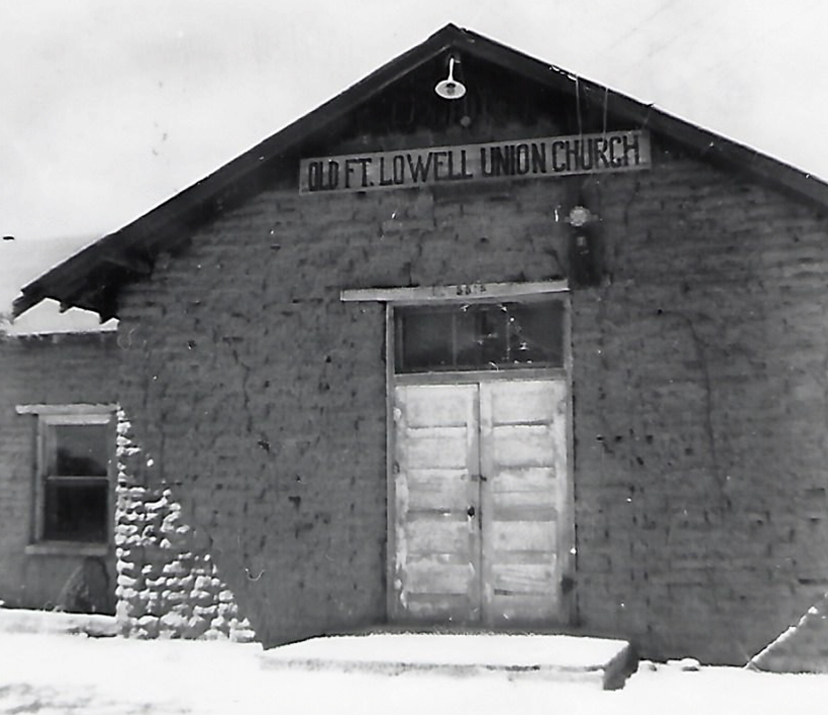
Fort Lowell Union Church, c. 1925

The Fort Lowell Union Church is an example of a mission church in the tradition of the American Southwest. This tradition dates back to the Spanish colonization of the region, when missionaries established adobe churches to serve both indigenous populations and settlers in remote areas. Drawing inspiration from this historical precedent, the Fort Lowell Union Church was conceived as a community-oriented mission church, embodying the ideals of service, outreach, and unity in a rural frontier setting.

Edward C. Clark, the church's founder, was deeply influenced by the missionary principles of Christian service, and he sought to provide a place of worship for the diverse population of the Fort Lowell area, which included Anglo, Hispanic, and Native American residents. His dedication to the mission of the church was symbolized by the bas-relief of the San Xavier Mission donated by trustee John C. Daly at the church's dedication in 1917. This relief connected the new church to the long tradition of missionary work in the Southwest, epitomized by the San Xavier del Bac Mission, a key spiritual and cultural landmark in the Tucson area.

The Fort Lowell Union Church followed the undemonstrative architecture typical of early mission churches, with a simple rectangular adobe structure and minimal adornments. Its mud adobe construction, typical of Southwest mission churches, not only reflected the resourcefulness of early settlers but also symbolized the church's integration with the natural landscape and cultural history of the region.

As a mission church, the Fort Lowell Union Church embodied a tradition of outreach and community service, supporting spiritual growth, education, and social cohesion in an isolated part of Tucson. It provided an inclusive, non-denominational space for worship, which allowed it to unify the community in a way that transcended religious divides. This inclusive mission became central to the church's identity as a social center and spiritual hub for the community throughout the 20th century, a role it continues to play in the Old Fort Lowell neighborhood. By embracing the mission church tradition, the Fort Lowell Union Church not only maintained the spiritual values associated with early missionary work in the region but also adapted these values to meet the needs of a modern, growing community in Tucson.

== Legal dispute and incorporation ==
In June 1933, a Fort Lowell Union Church was officially incorporated. Trustees at the time included George W. Royer, L.E. Brown, W.J. Lusby, F.W. Jordan, and J.C. Daly. However, the church faced a legal dispute between Daly and Jordan regarding control over the building. The case, which was heard by Judge Fred Fickett in Superior Court, revolved around ownership rights, with Daly seeking an injunction against Jordan. In January 1934, a judgment was rendered in favor of Jordan's group, allowing them to continue using the building for religious services.

== Mid-20th century and the PAN American Literature Mission ==
After World War II, additional changes were made to the building, including concrete block additions in the 1960s to accommodate the PAN American Literature Mission, which has continued to use the building as its headquarters. The church's role as a community hub persisted, with events such as Bundles for Britain, a war relief organization, holding meetings there in the 1940s.

== Legacy ==
The church was known for its simple yet artistic interior, the original color scheme of gray and green. The incorporation of elements like the bas-relief of the San Xavier Mission and the historic pulpit added to the church's cultural and spiritual significance. For over a century, the Fort Lowell Union Church has stood as a symbol of community, spirituality, and cultural continuity in the Fort Lowell neighborhood. From its inception as a small adobe chapel to its ongoing use by the PAN American Literature Mission, the church remains a testament to the enduring spirit of the community that built it.
