= Fort Lowell (Tucson, Arizona) =

United States Army post

- Tucson, Arizona
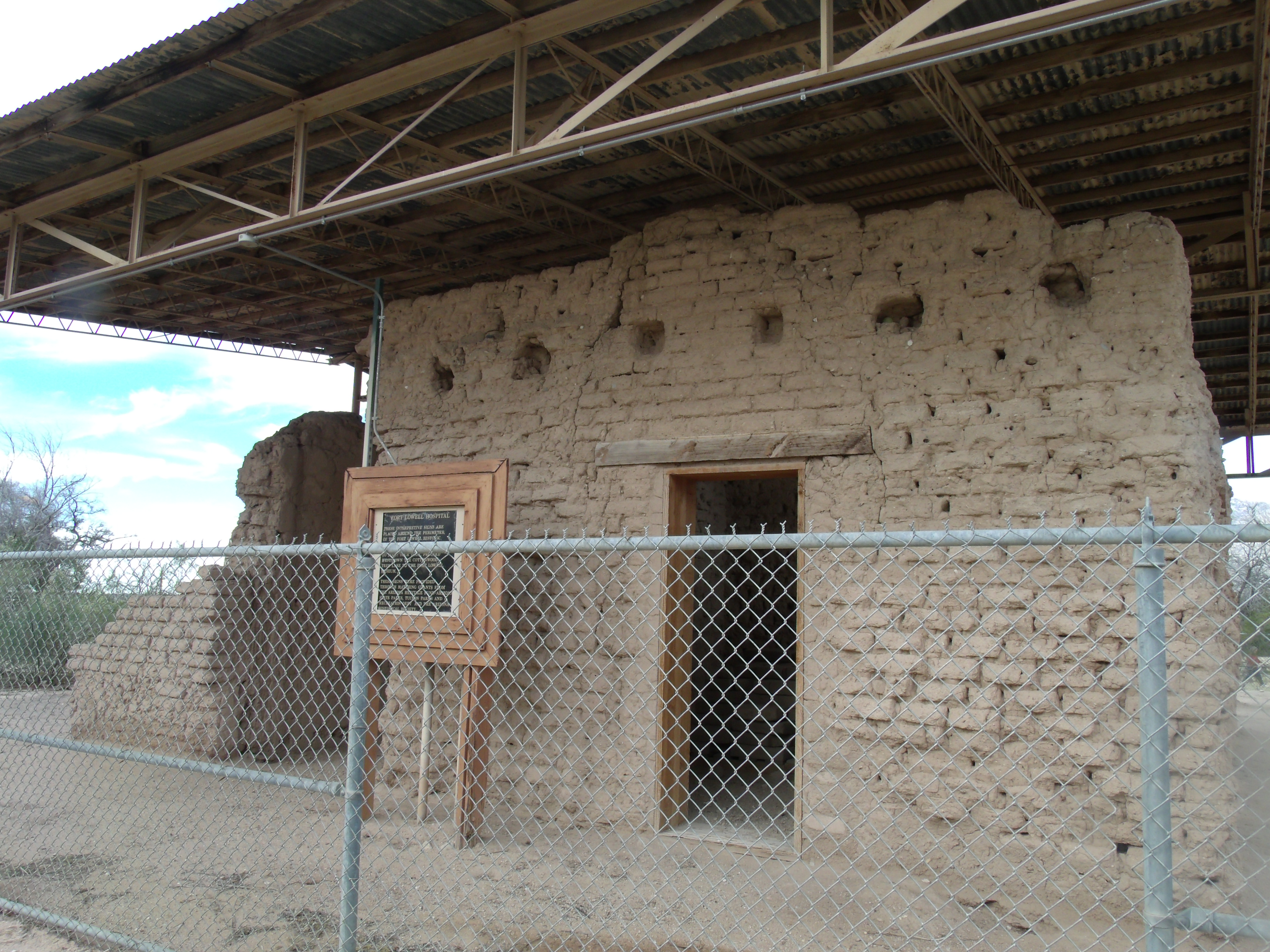
- Ruins of the hospital at Old Fort Lowell, Tucson

Site information
- Type: Army fortification
- Controlled by: Arizona
- Condition: Tourist attraction

Location
- Coordinates: 32°15′36″N 110°52′26″W

Site history
- Built: 1873
- Built by: United States
- In use: 1873–1891
- Materials: adobe, mesquite, earth
- Battles/wars: Apache Wars

Garrison information
- Occupants: United States Army

Fort Lowell was a United States Army post active from 1873 to 1891 on the outskirts of Tucson, Arizona. Fort Lowell was the successor to Camp Lowell, an earlier Army installation. The Army chose a location just south of the confluence of the Tanque Verde and Pantano creeks, at the point where they form the Rillito River, due to the year-round supply of water during that period. The Hohokam natives had chosen the site centuries earlier, presumably for the same reason. To this day, shards of Hohokam pottery can still be found in the area. The Army claimed a military reservation that encompassed approximately eighty square miles and extended east toward the Rincon Mountains.

== History ==
The Post of Tucson was established May 20, 1862, after the California Column drove Confederate forces from the area. The post was abandoned in July 1864 and reestablished in July 1865. On August 29, 1866, the post was renamed Camp Lowell in honor of General Charles Russell Lowell, who died from wounds sustained during the Battle of Cedar Creek. Initially located on the east side of Sixth Avenue, between Twelfth and Fourteenth Streets, the post was moved for sanitary reasons to a location about 7 miles (11 km) east of town on March 31, 1873. The post's name was changed to Fort Lowell on April 5, 1879.

=== Old West Era ===
The fort played a pivotal role during the Apache Wars, providing additional protection for the Tucson area. Far too large and well-manned to be attacked directly, Fort Lowell provided supplies and manpower for outlying military installations. During its eighteen years of operation, the fort averaged thirteen officers and 239 enlisted men. Among the units present during this period were the 2nd, 4th, 5th and 6th Cavalry Regiments, as well as the 1st, 8th, and 12th Infantry Regiments.

The orientation of the post was set according to magnetic north. It featured a large parade grounds, officers' quarters, quartermaster and commissary storehouses, corrals, quarters for enlisted men as well as for married non-commissioned officers. The most prominent building on post was the hospital, the adobe remnants of which still stand under a protective structure. A lane lined with cottonwood trees, aptly named Cottonwood Lane, graced the area in front of the officers' houses.

Among the more well known officers to have served at Fort Lowell were the young Walter Reed, the Army physician famous for his yellow fever research, and Charles Bendire, the amateur ornithologist after whom Bendire's thrasher is named.

== El Fuerte ==
After the Army decommissioned the post in 1891, the civilian occupied military reservation land was sold and private farms were reestablished along the Rillito River. Mexican families from Sonora soon moved north to take advantage of the "free" repurposed fort housing and framing jobs. In the early 20th century the small village continued to grow west of the ruins of the old fort. This occupation has become known as the El Fuerte Period.

The small community of adobe houses would continue grow in the first two decades of the 20th century to include the El Callejón Fort Lowell School, and two churches, San Pedro Chapel and the Fort Lowell Union Church. These three civic building created the nexus of the village center and formed an informal plaza.

== Fort Lowell Art Colony ==
In the 1930s Nan, Pete and Charles Bolsius rebuilt the crumbling adobe ruin of the Post Traders Store making it their home and studio. Through the 1940s a number of other artists moved into the Fort Lowell area establishing a burgeoning artist colony. Significant artists and intellectuals built homes and lived in the area including: René Cheruy and Germaine Cheruy, Win Ellis, modernist painter Jack Maul, sculptor and designer Giorgio Belloli, Charles Bode, architectural designer Veronica Hughart, anthropologists Edward H. Spicer and Rosamond Spicer, photographer Hazel Larson Archer and weaver Ruth Brown. The artist colony attracted writers and poets including beat generation Alan Harrington and Jack Kerouac whose visit is documented in his iconic book On the Road.

=== Notable artists and writers (20th century) ===
- Charles Bolsius, Painter, Prints, Woodwork, Architectural Design
- Nan Bolsius, author, Woodwork
- Pete Bolsius, Tinwork
- Hazel Larson Archer, photographer
- Byrd Baylor, author
- Charles Bode, Painter, designer
- Ruth Brown, Weaver
- Paul Clinco, Writer and filmmaker
- Gordon H. Heck, Architect and historian
- Harriet House Shoup, artist
- Win Ellis, artist
- Keith Martin, furniture builder
- Giorgio Belloli, artist, Sculpture, Furniture Design
- Ivan Burkhart, photographer
- René Cheruy, artist, Sculpture
- Germaine Cheruy Artist, Painter
- Alan Harrington, author
- Veronica Hughart, Architectural Design
- Barry Hughart, novelist
- Jack Maul, Artist (5344 East Fort Lowell Road)
- Ruth Phipps, Jewelry and Iron work
- Robert Knowe, artist
- Edward H. Spicer, Anthropologist
- Rosamond Spicer, Anthropologist
- Nik Krevitsky, Abstract Expressionist, Dancer
- Winnie Yates

== Fort Lowell and the Boy Scouts of Tucson ==
"The Boy Scouts had a long connection to Fort Lowell," explained columnist David Leighton, in the Arizona Daily Star newspaper on February 5, 2017:

The first known visit to the old fort ruins by the Boy Scouts of Tucson, which had been established the year before, occurred in April 1912. The scouts marched out to the abandoned fort under the direction of a member of the University of Arizona's military cadet program. During the week-long encampment the boys did a lot of drilling like soldiers but also were given some free time to search for Native American relics.

A couple years later, the Fort Lowell Boy Scouts troop, which was formed from boys in the neighborhood that had grown up around the old Ft. Lowell ruins, called El Fuerte and a farming community, populated by Mormons, farther west that came to be named Binghamton. The two troops played a baseball game that year and are believed to have used the area fairly regularly for campouts, target practice etc. until about 1921, when Camp Lawton opened on Mount Lemmon. Within a few years, the Boy Scouts of Tucson became part of the Catalina Council of the Boy Scouts of America.

As the years passed, the old fort traded hands a few times, at one point being under the control of the Arizona State Museum of the University of Arizona.

In 1945, with the assistance of prominent local rancher Carlos Ronstadt, the Boy Scouts bid and obtained 40 acres of the old ruins while preventing the land from falling into the hands of developers, who were rumored to have plans of constructing a subdivision where the ruins existed.

A water system was put in place by the Boy Scouts and volunteers and three structures were acquired and donated to the site. One of the structures was used as the Ft. Lowell Training Center and another structure as the Ranger Station. In 1953, the scouts obtained the funds to have a roof built over the remains of the post hospital that still exists today, constructed a rail fence around the hospital ruins which was later replaced by a chain link fence and put up a flagpole just to the south of the remains.

While many successful scout events took place there, by 1957 it was realized that the Boy Scouts didn't have enough money to maintain the site and sold it to Pima County that year.

== Fort Lowell Park ==
- Fort Lowell Park
- U.S. National Register of Historic Places
- U.S. Historic district
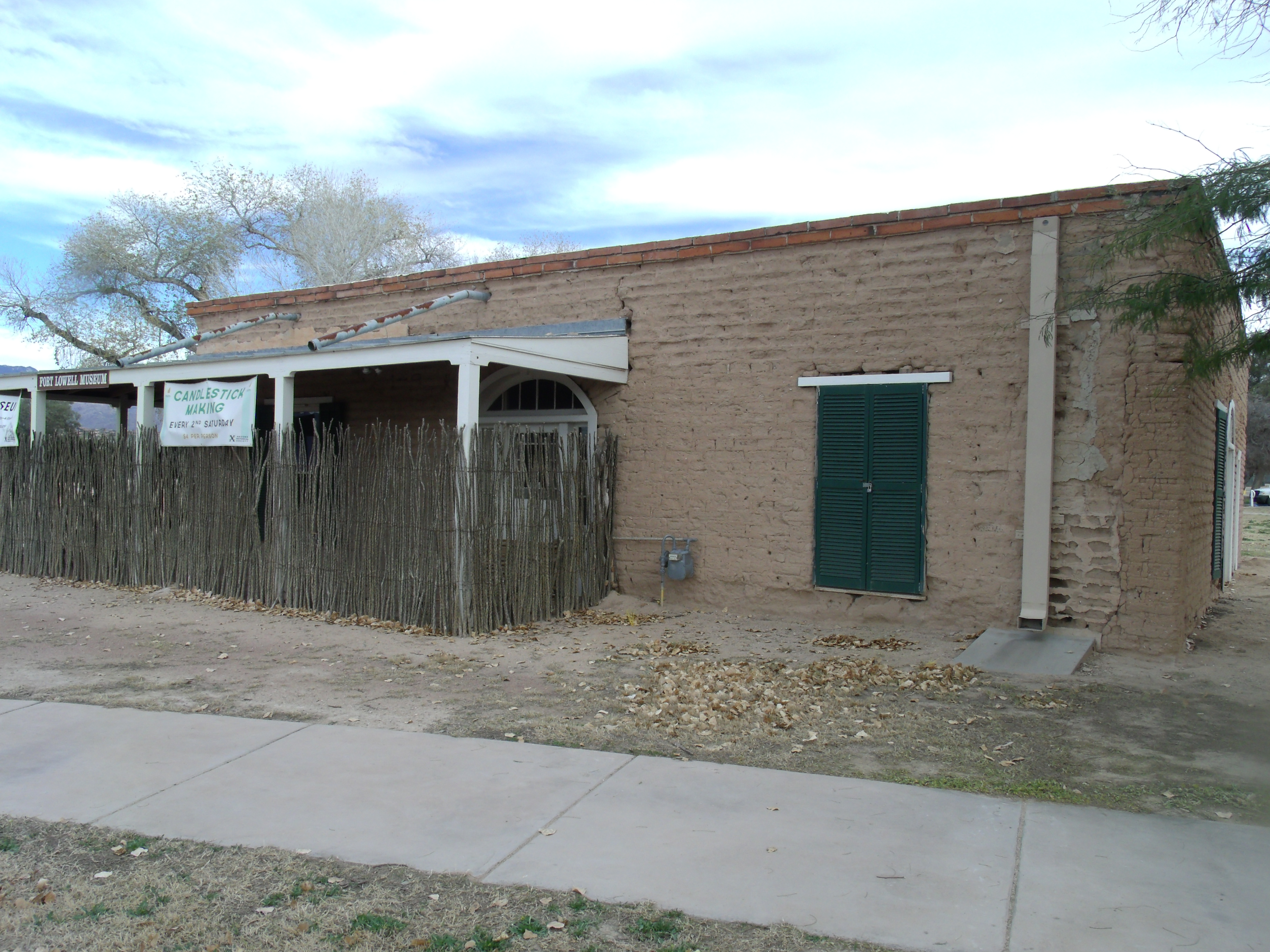
- Fort Lowell Park Museum
- Location: 2900 North Craycroft Road, Tucson, Arizona
- Area: 20 acres (8.1 ha)
- Built: 1878
- NRHP reference No.: 78003358
- Added to NRHP: 1978

The fort lay in ruins for many years and many of its adobe structures went into disrepair. Some of the portions of the fort were sold to the families in Tucson. Among the families which acquired in 1928, large portions where the fort was situated was the Adkins family. The Adkins family established a steel tank manufacturing business on the site. In 2006, Jim Campbell, a local developer, purchased the property (known as the Adkins Parcel) and then traded the property to the City of Tucson. The City and County had been attempting to purchase the Adkins Parcel for over 30 years. In 2009, the city in association with Pima County created a Master Plan for the creation and development of what was to become the Fort Lowell Park. The park features ball fields, tennis and racquetball courts, a large public swimming pool, and the Fort Lowell Museum dedicated to Fort Lowell's days as an active military installation. Fort Lowell also includes a large pond.

The Adkins Parcel that Tucson purchased from Jim Campbell lies immediately west of Craycroft Road where the last of the original officers' quarters stand. Plans indicated that they would be open to the public as a museum. However, high levels of lead paint were found and the buildings were not opened. On the north end of the former Adkins parcel stands a pile of large stones that, according to local lore, formed a wall of the guardhouse in which Geronimo was kept prior to his removal from Arizona.

The Fort Lowell Museum is located in the reconstructed Commanding Officer's quarters and is run by the Tucson Presidio Trust which also runs the Presidio San Agustín del Tucsón. Exhibits focus on military life on the Arizona frontier. The Fort Lowell Historic District is the neighborhood located on or near Fort Lowell. It is set aside as a historic district.

Fort Lowell is the historical setting of the 1957–1958 syndicated Western television series, Boots and Saddles, starring John Pickard, Patrick McVey, and Gardner McKay.

A reconstructed Fort Lowell was featured in the 1972 film Ulzana's Raid, starring Burt Lancaster. However, the reconstructed fort was actually built in an area just southwest of the Santa Rita Mountains, near Nogales, Arizona.

== National Register of Historic Places ==
Fort Lowell Park and the ruins within the property were listed in the National Register of Historic Places on December 13, 1978. Other properties, which belong to the park or which in the past belonged to Fort Lowell, are individually listed in National Register of Historic Places and include

- Charles Bolsius House, listed December 13, 1978, a 20th-century house built around one of the fort's original storehouses
- Fort Lowell Officer's Quarter's listed December 13, 1978
- Fort Lowell Quartermaster's Quarters listed December 13, 1978
- Las Saetas, Fort Lowell Post Traders Store listed December 13, 1978
- El Cuartel Viejo, Fort Lowell Quartermaster and Commissary Storehouse listed December 13, 1978
- Fort Lowell Quartermaster's Storehouse listed December 13, 1978
- San Pedro Chapel (St. Peter's at Fort Lowell Mission) listed April 28, 1993

== Gallery ==
Structures and plaques located in Fort Lowell Park.

Fort Lowell Structures
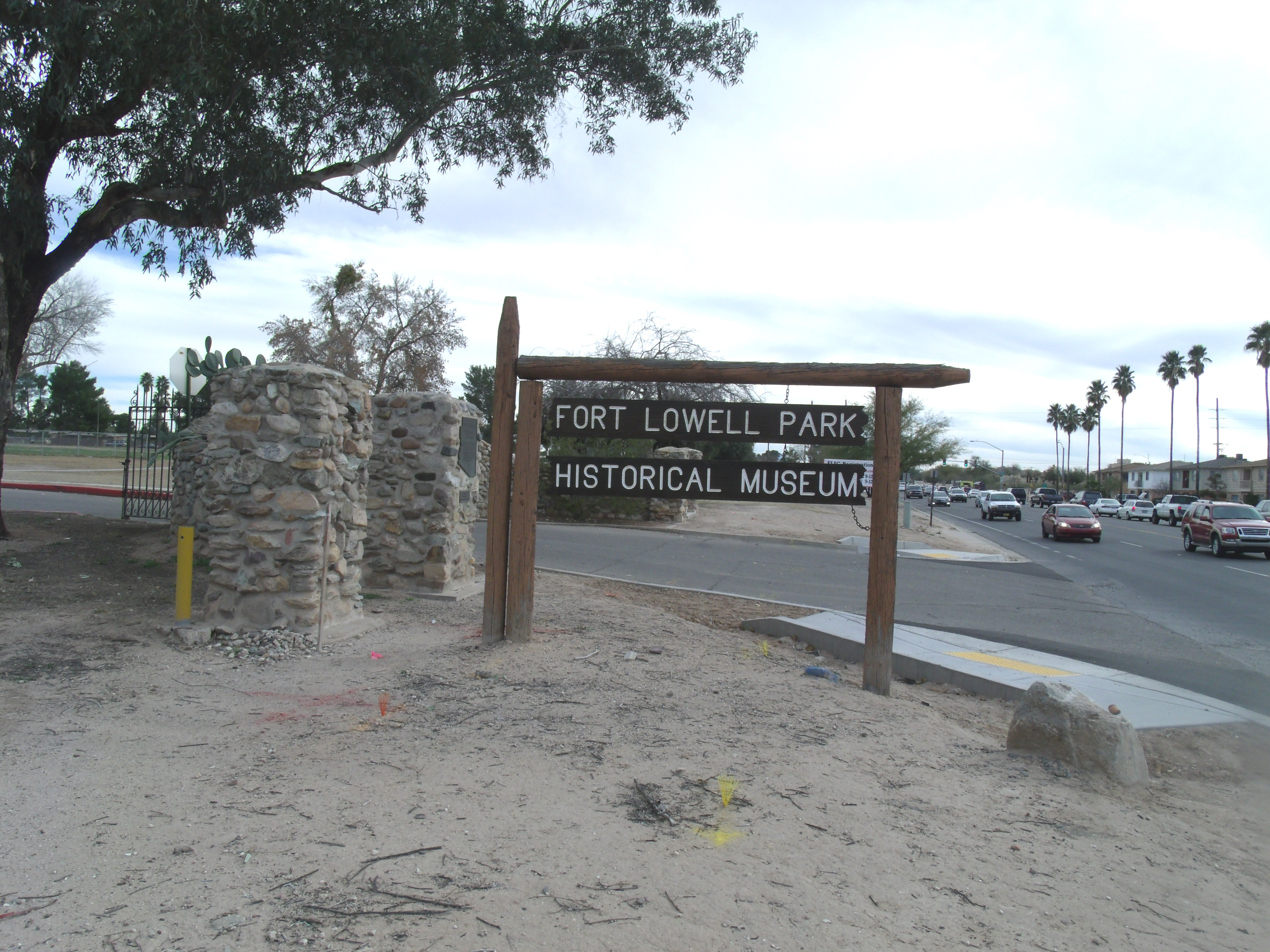
Entrance to Fort Lowell Park

Statue of cavalry soldier at Fort Lowell Park.

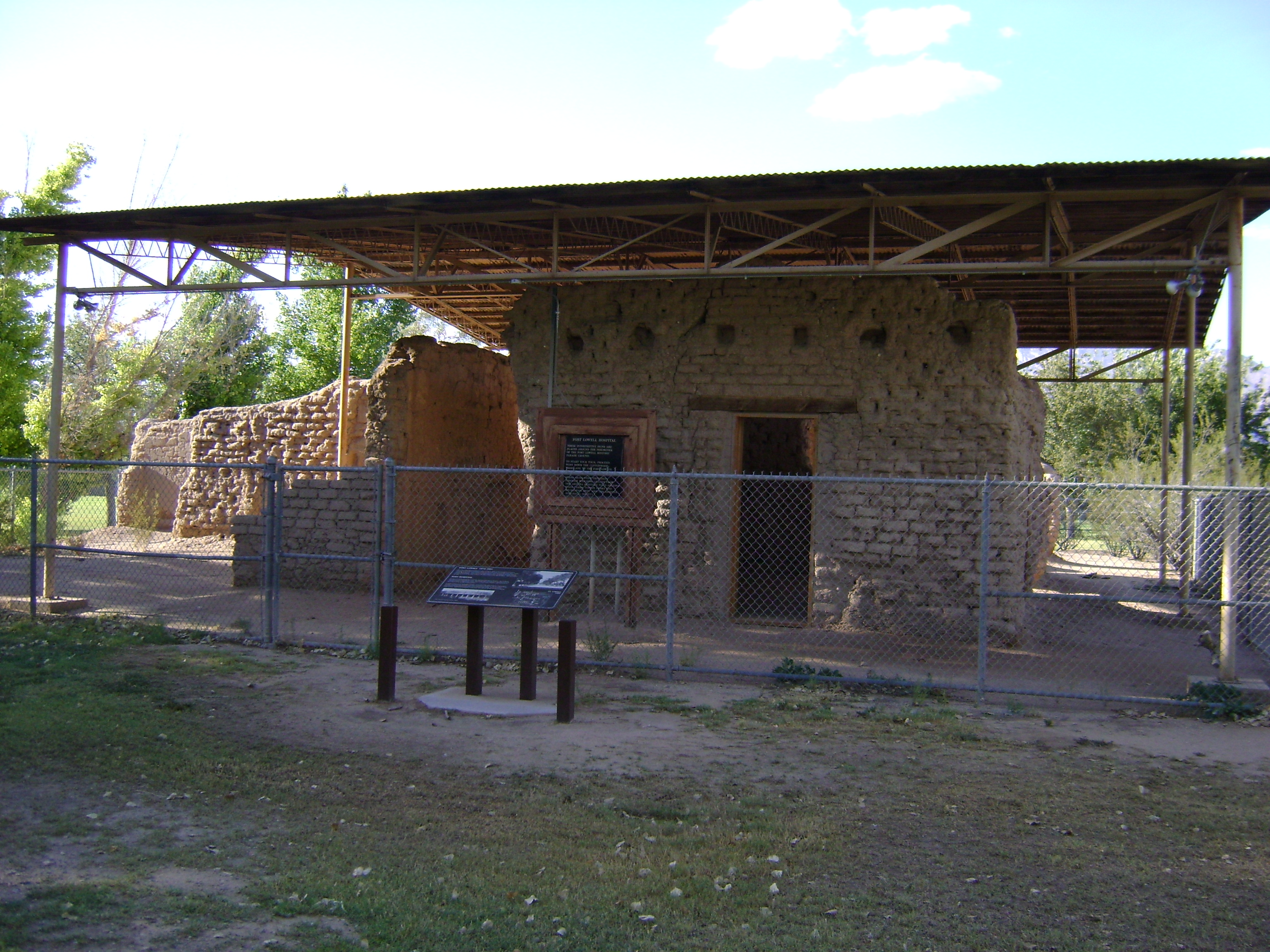
Ruins of the post hospital.

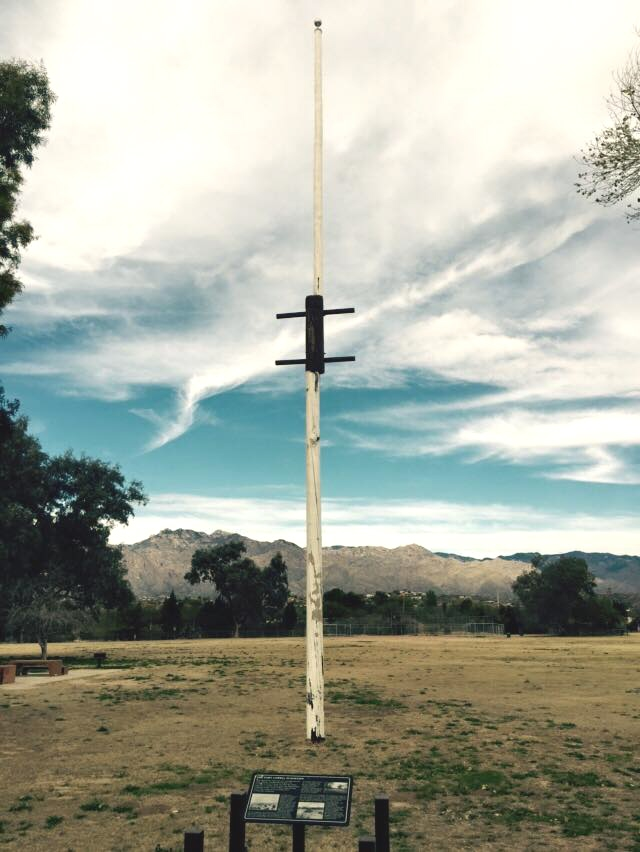
The third reconstructed flagstaff in Fort Lowell

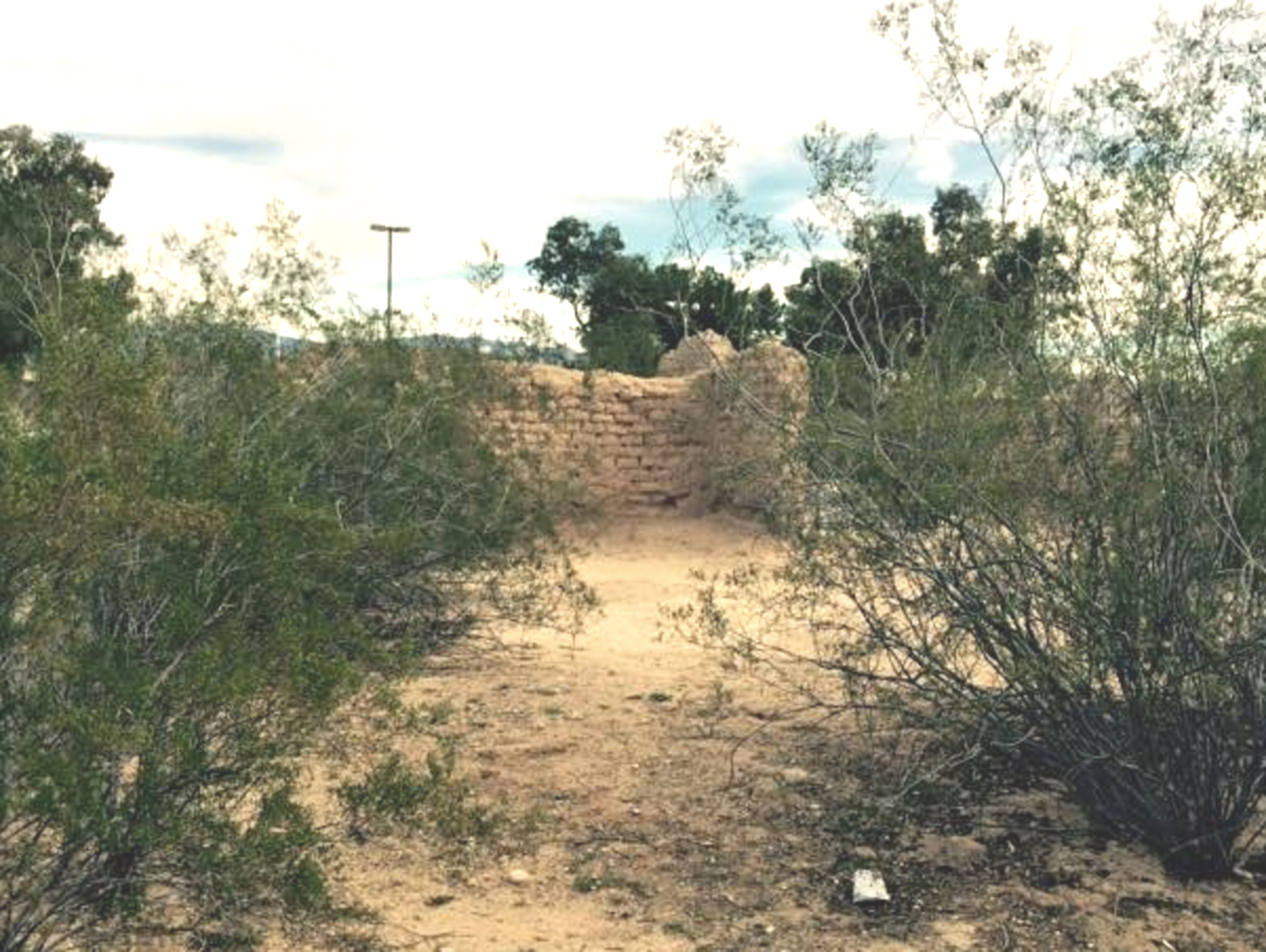
The adobe ruins of one of two soldier barracks

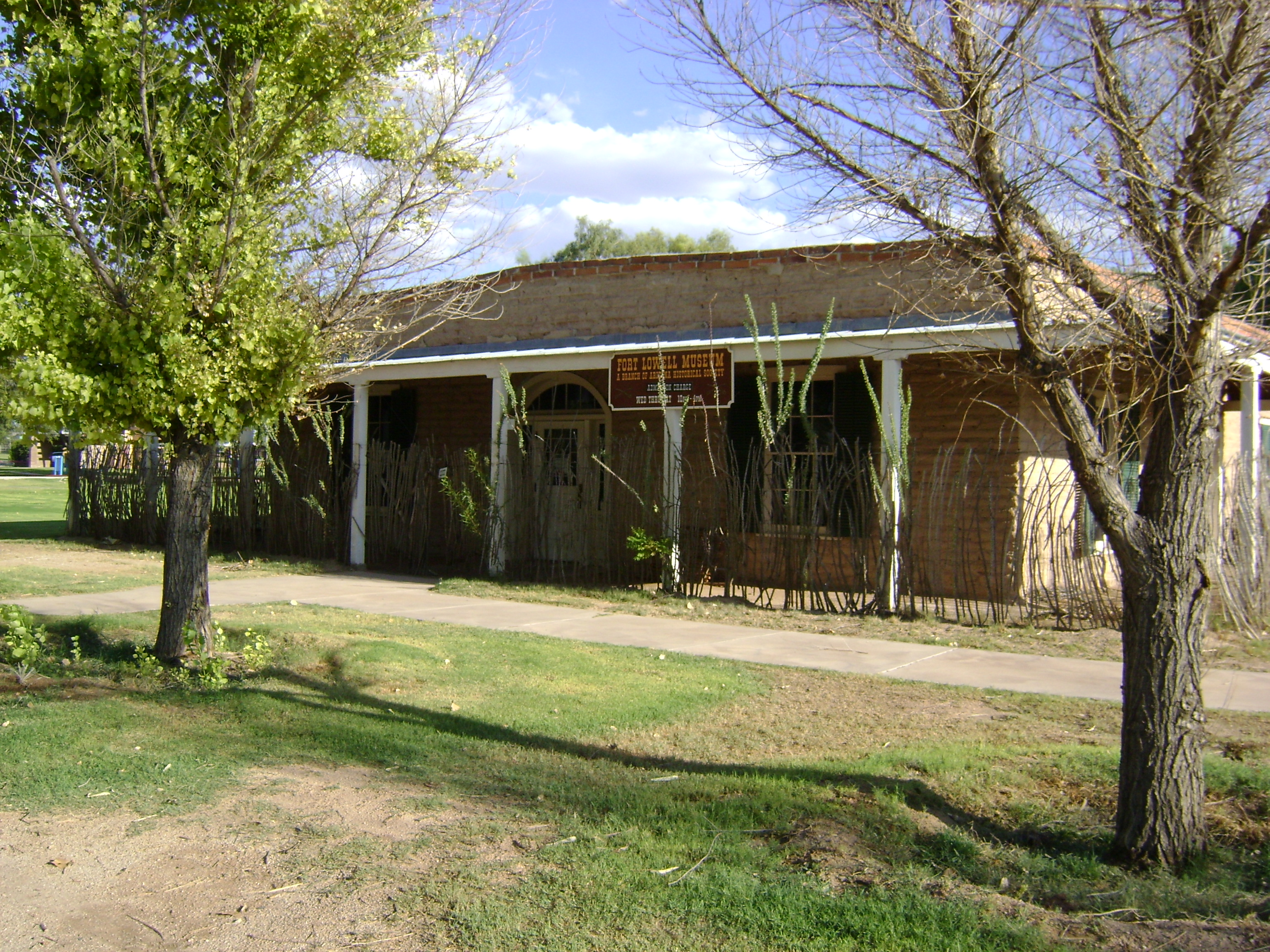
The Fort Lowell Museum.

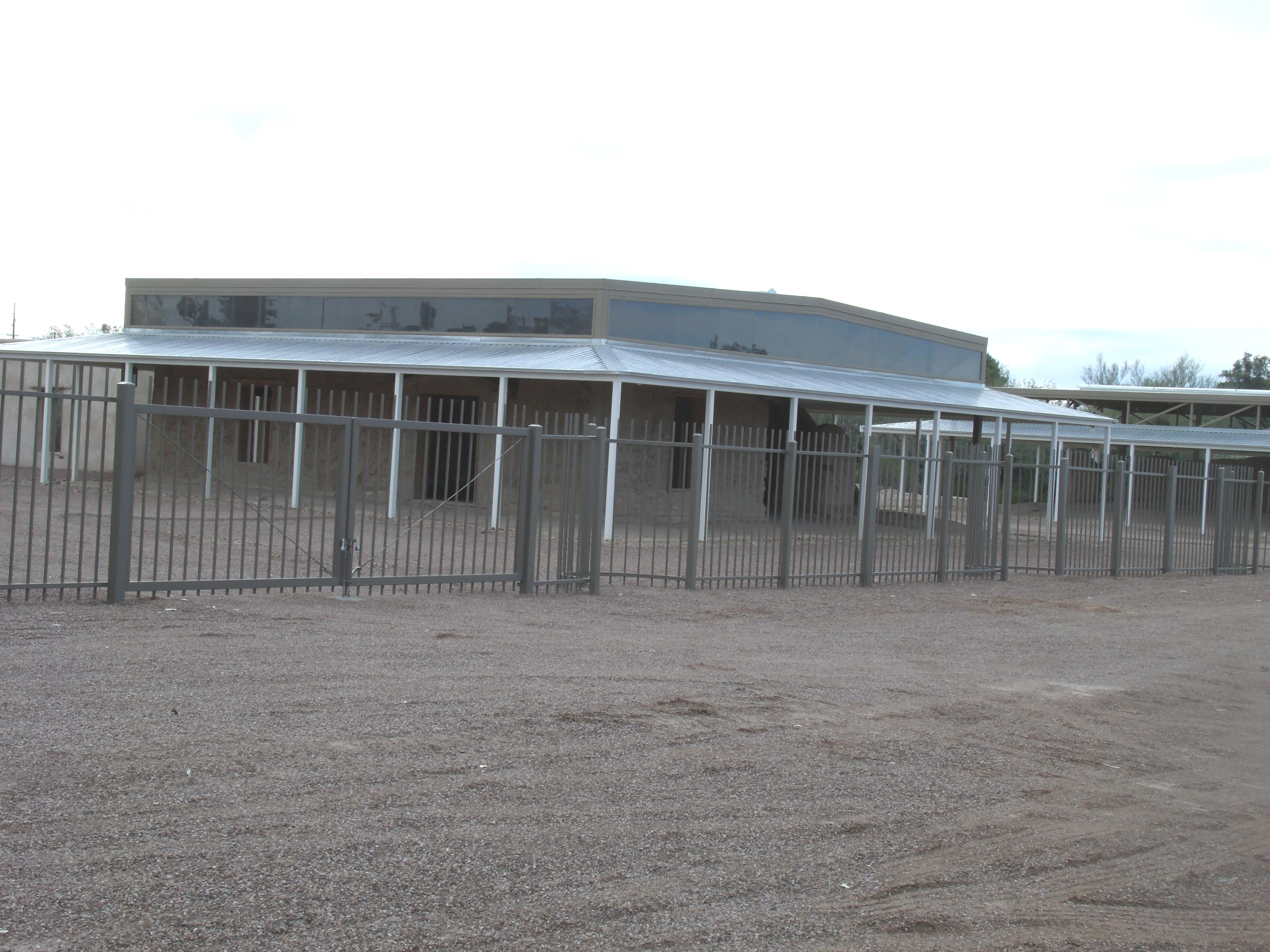
The Quartermaster's Quarters

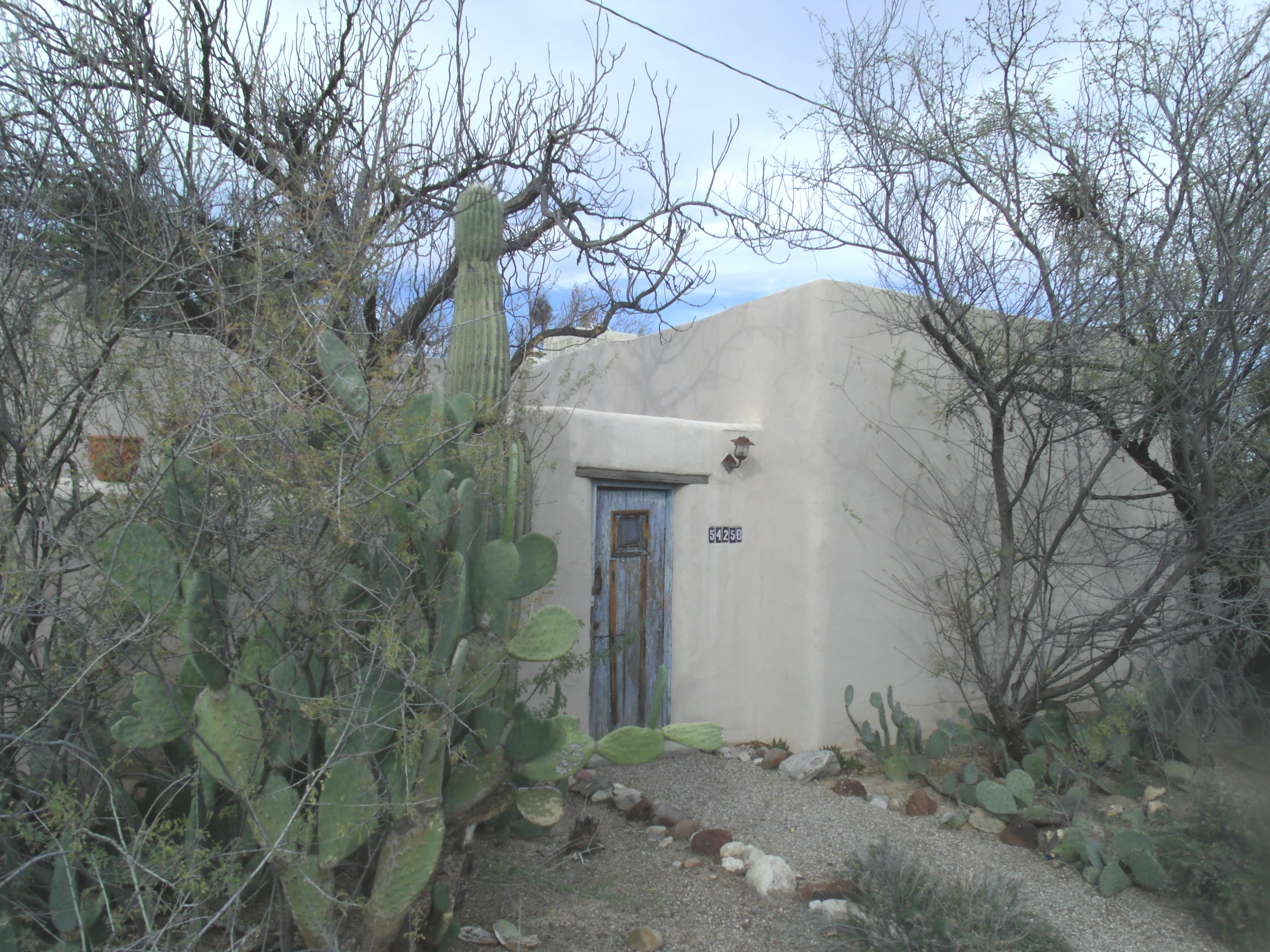
The Fort Lowell Post Traders Store and "Riallito House" located at 5425 E. Fort Lowell Rd.

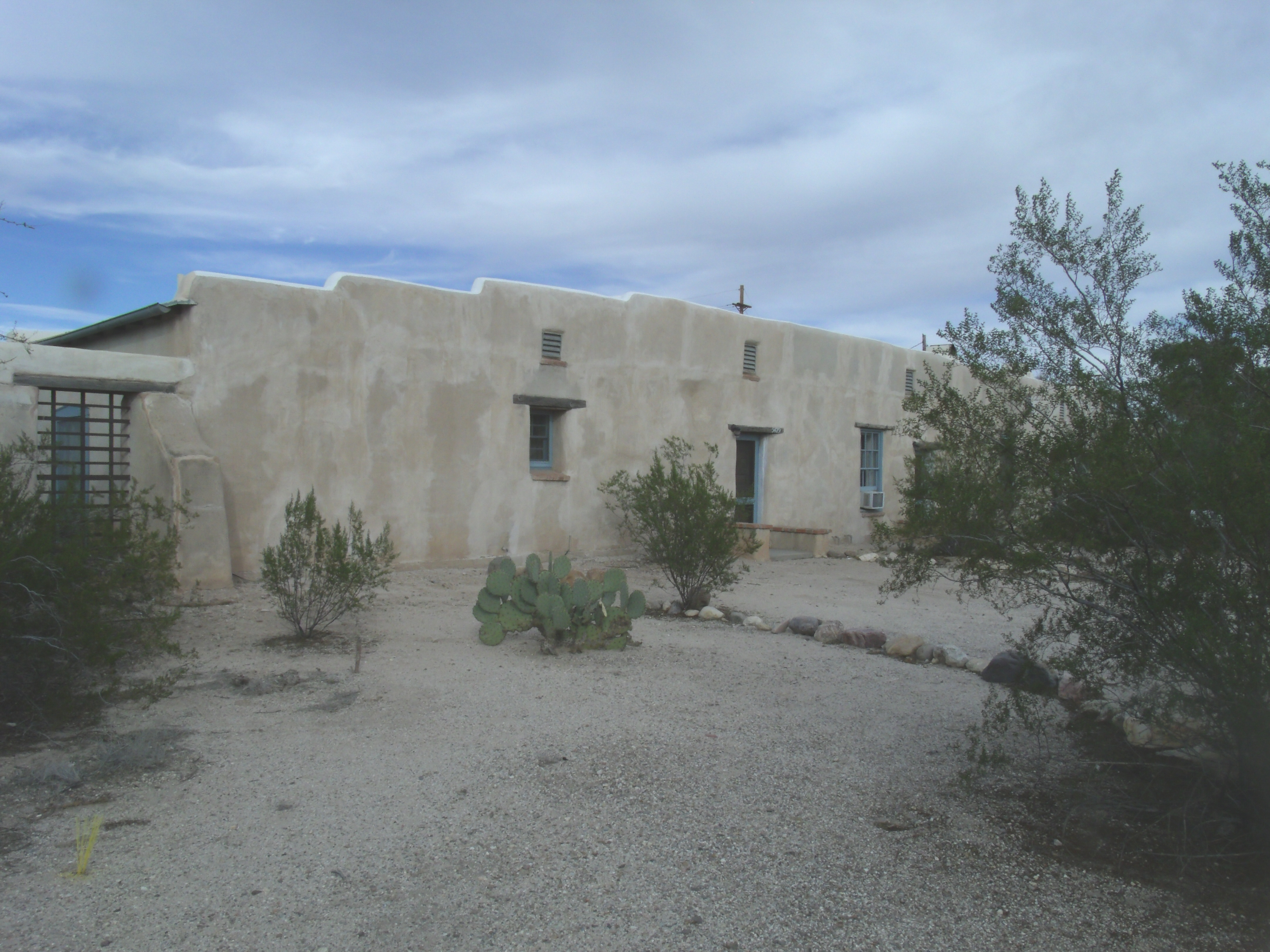
The Fort Lowell Quartermaster's Storehouse located at 5479 E. Fort Lowell Rd.

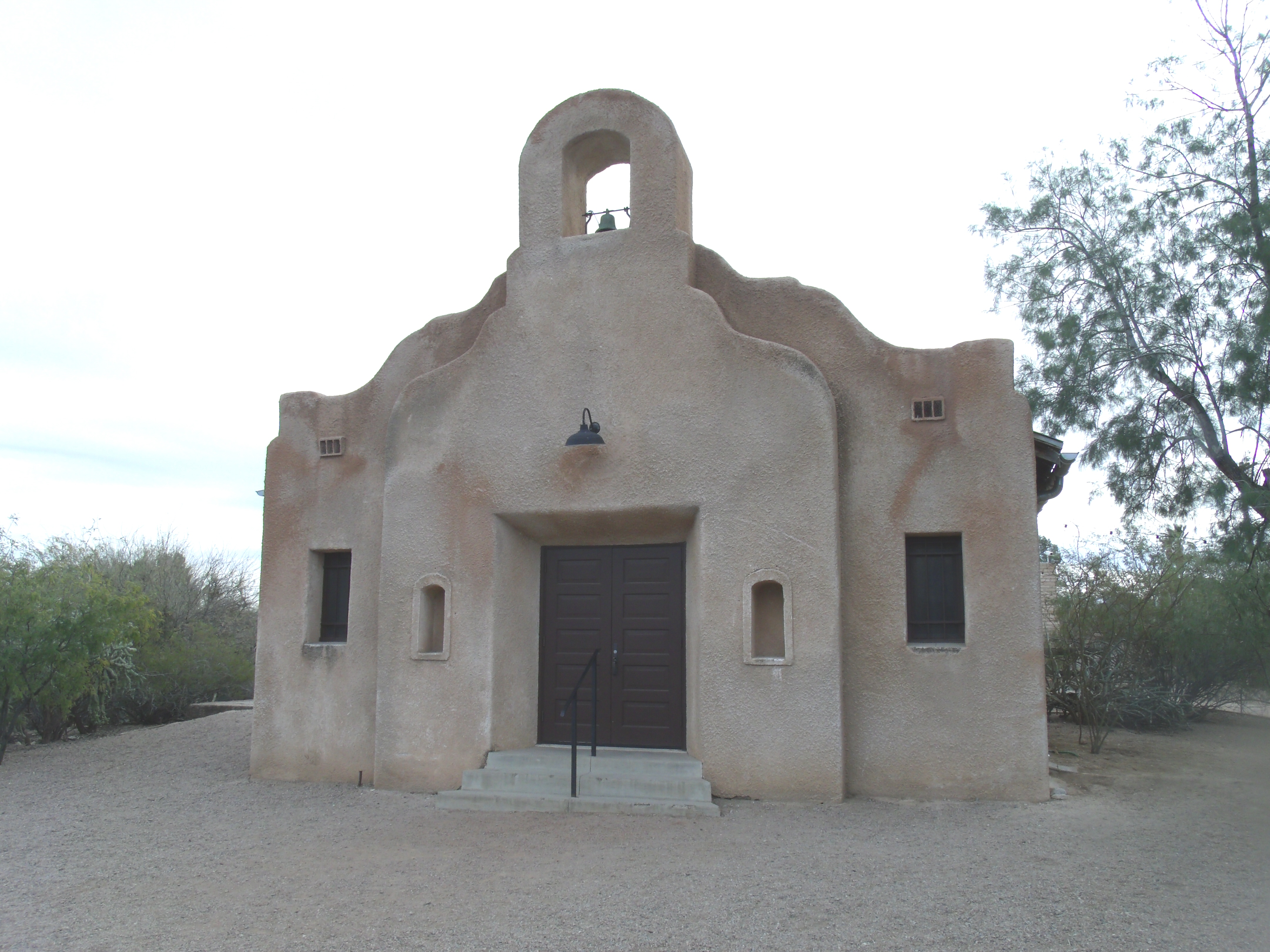
The San Pedro Chapel, also known as the San Pedro de Fort Lowell (St. Peter's at Fort Lowell Mission).
Fort Lowell plaques
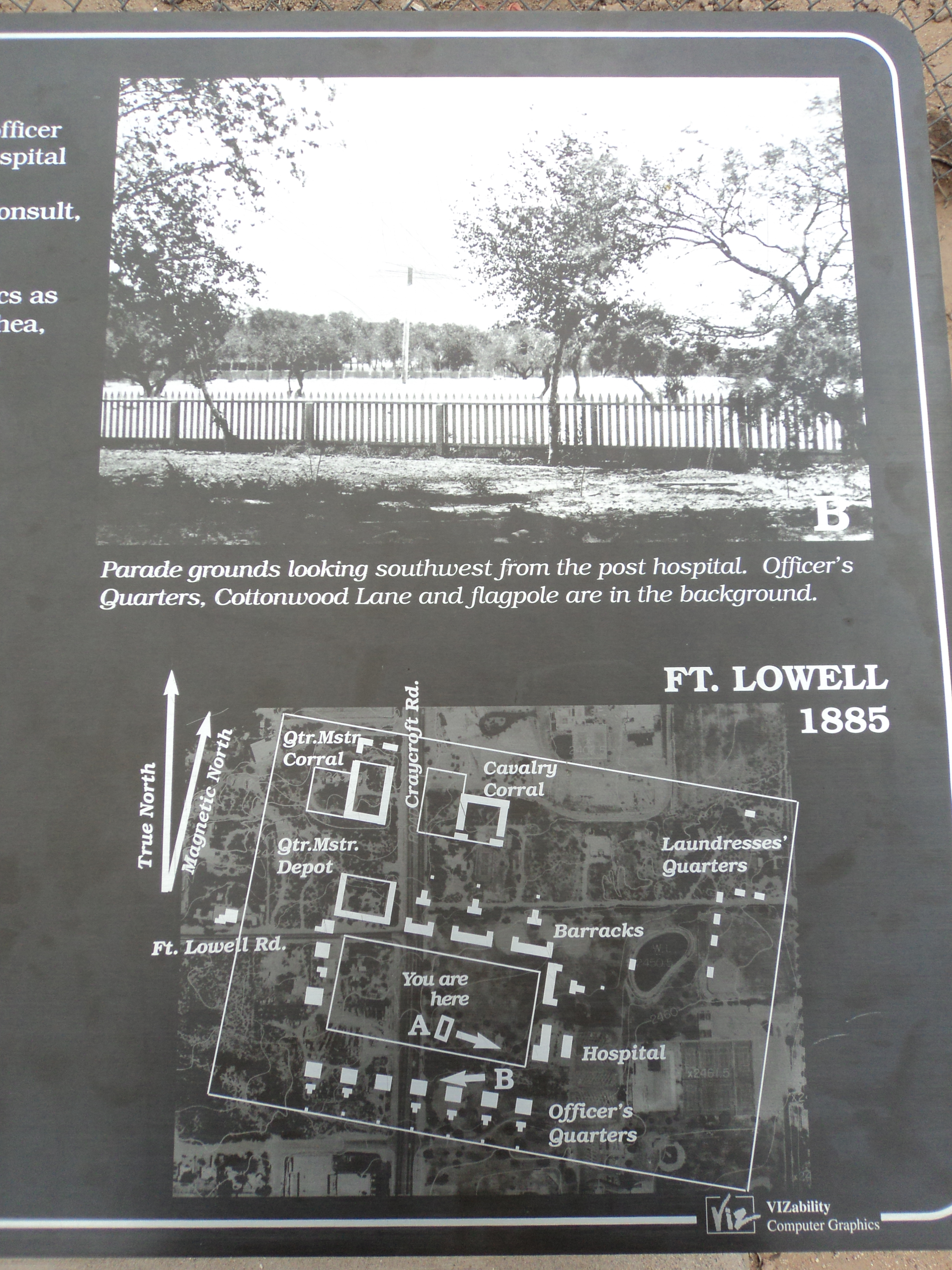
Second part of the previous plaque.

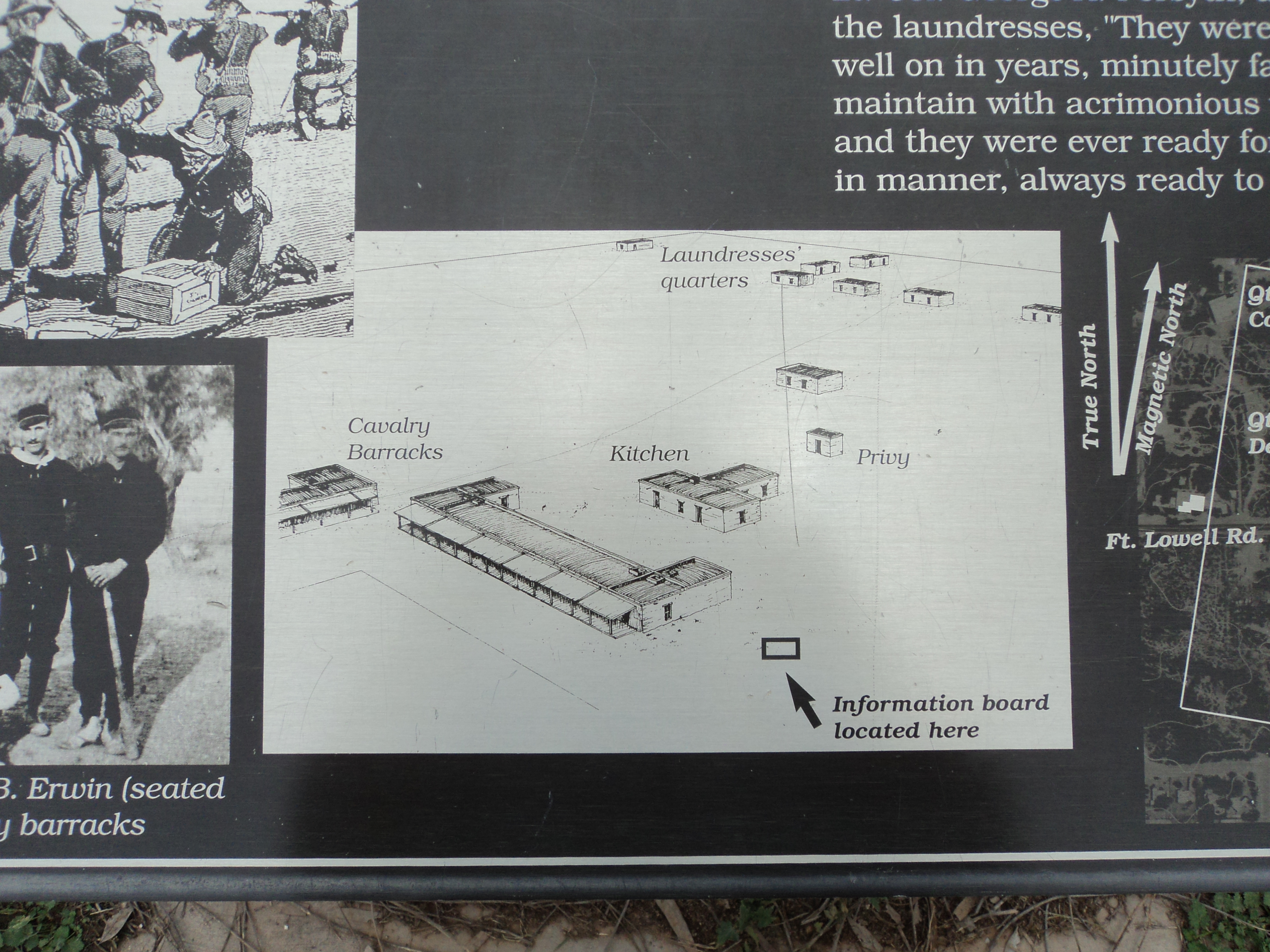
Middle part of the previous plaque.

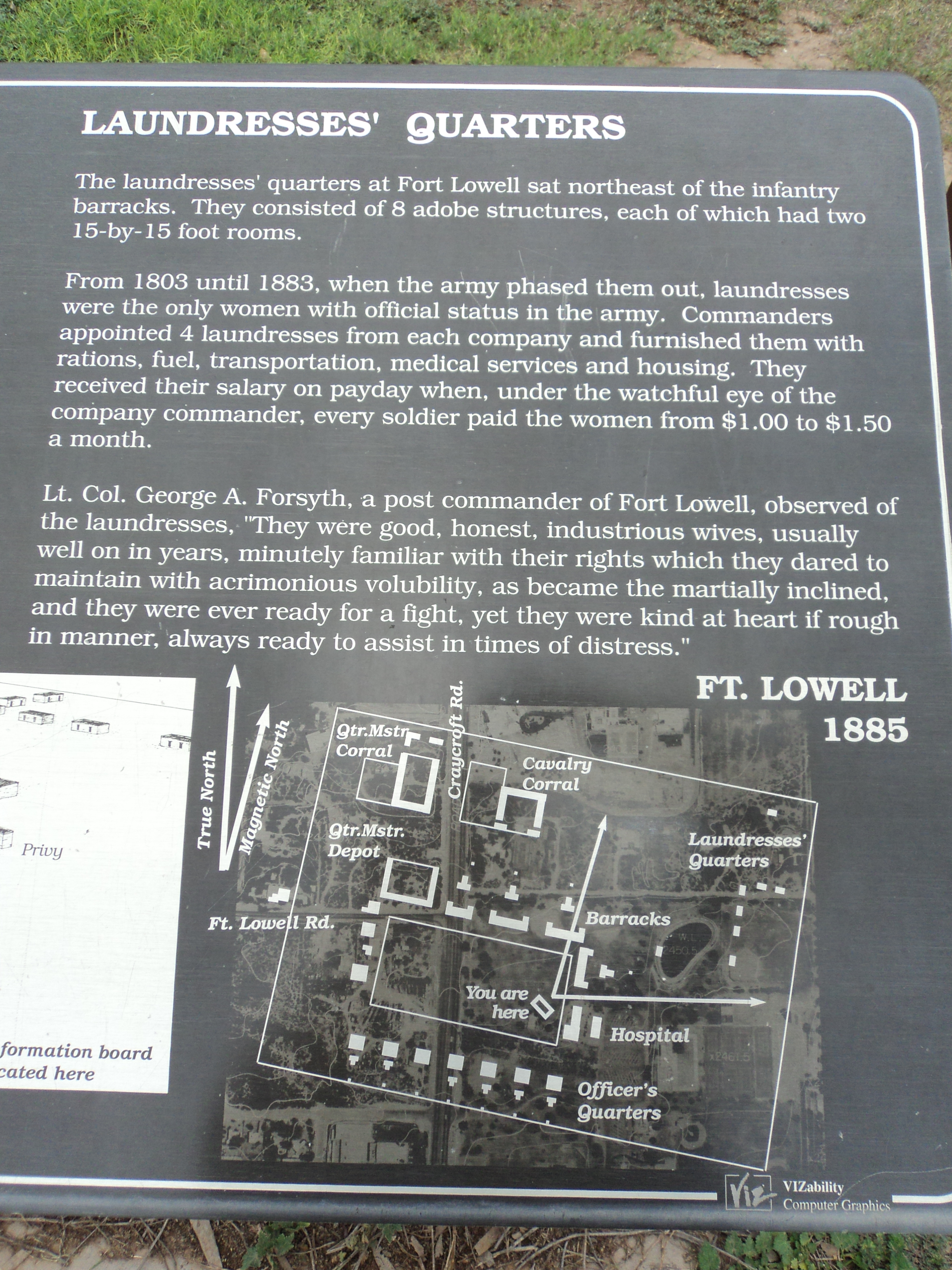
Right half of the previous plaque.

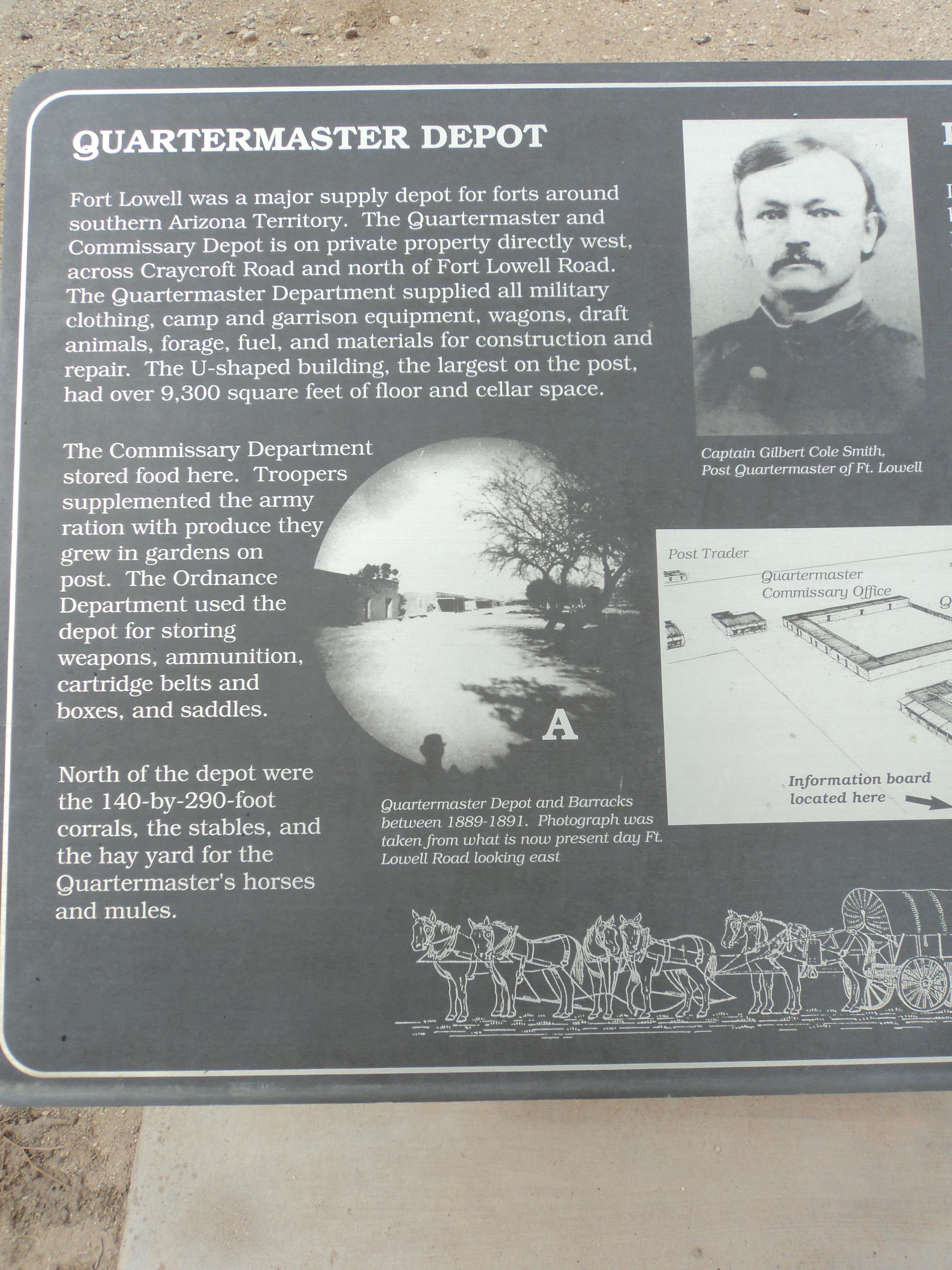
Left half of Quartermaster information board.

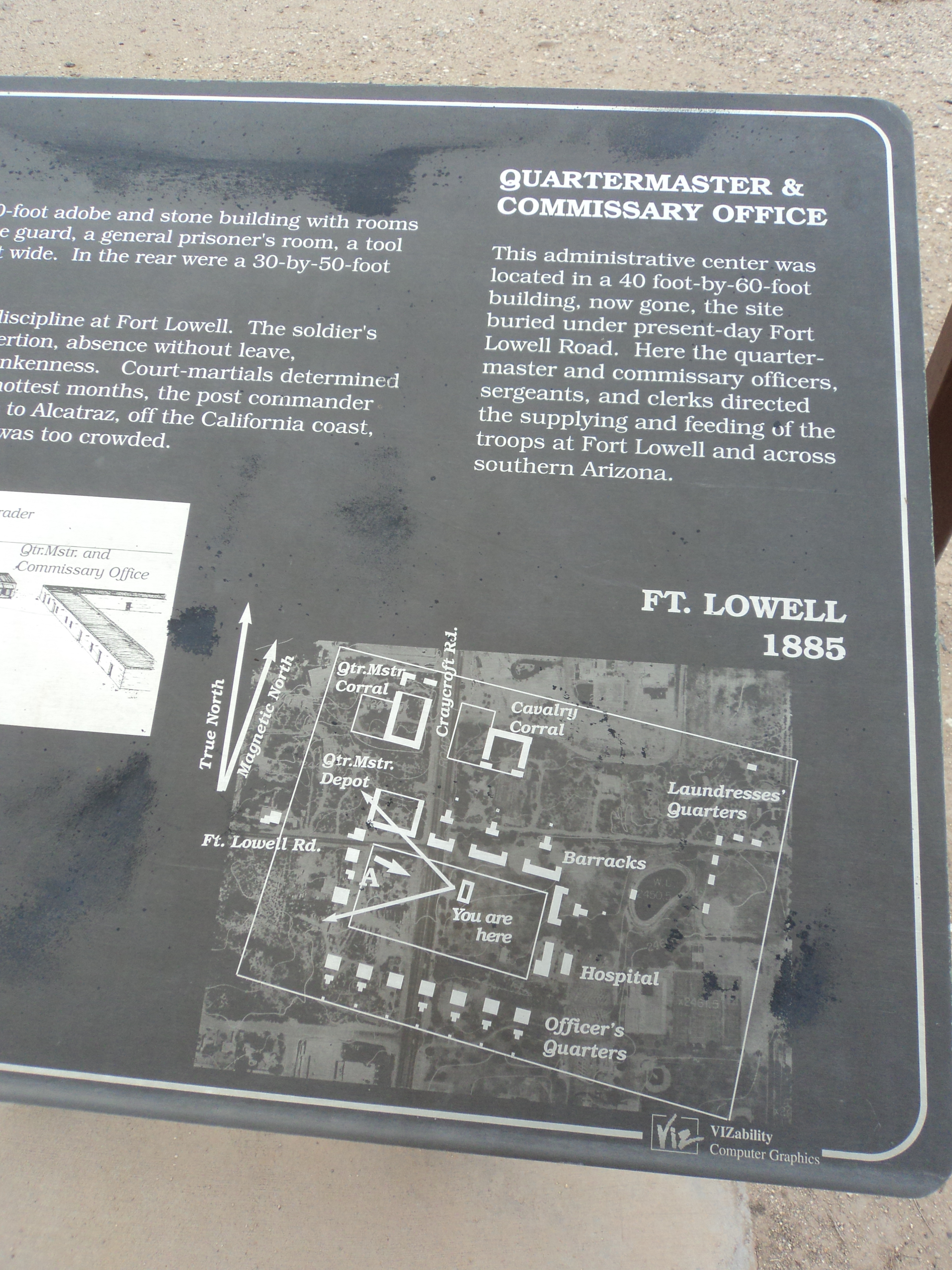
Right half of Quartermaster information board.

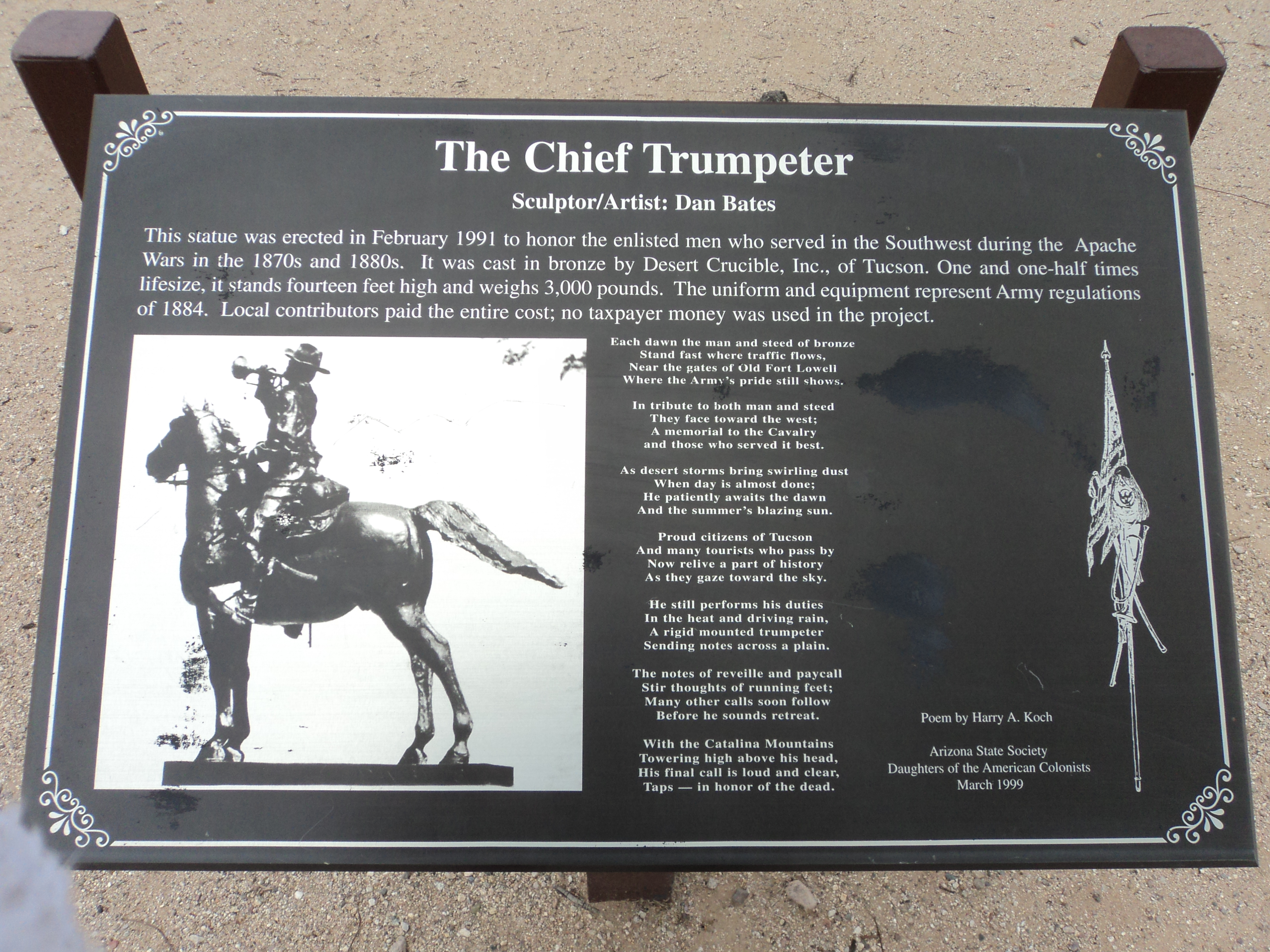
Information board detailing statue.

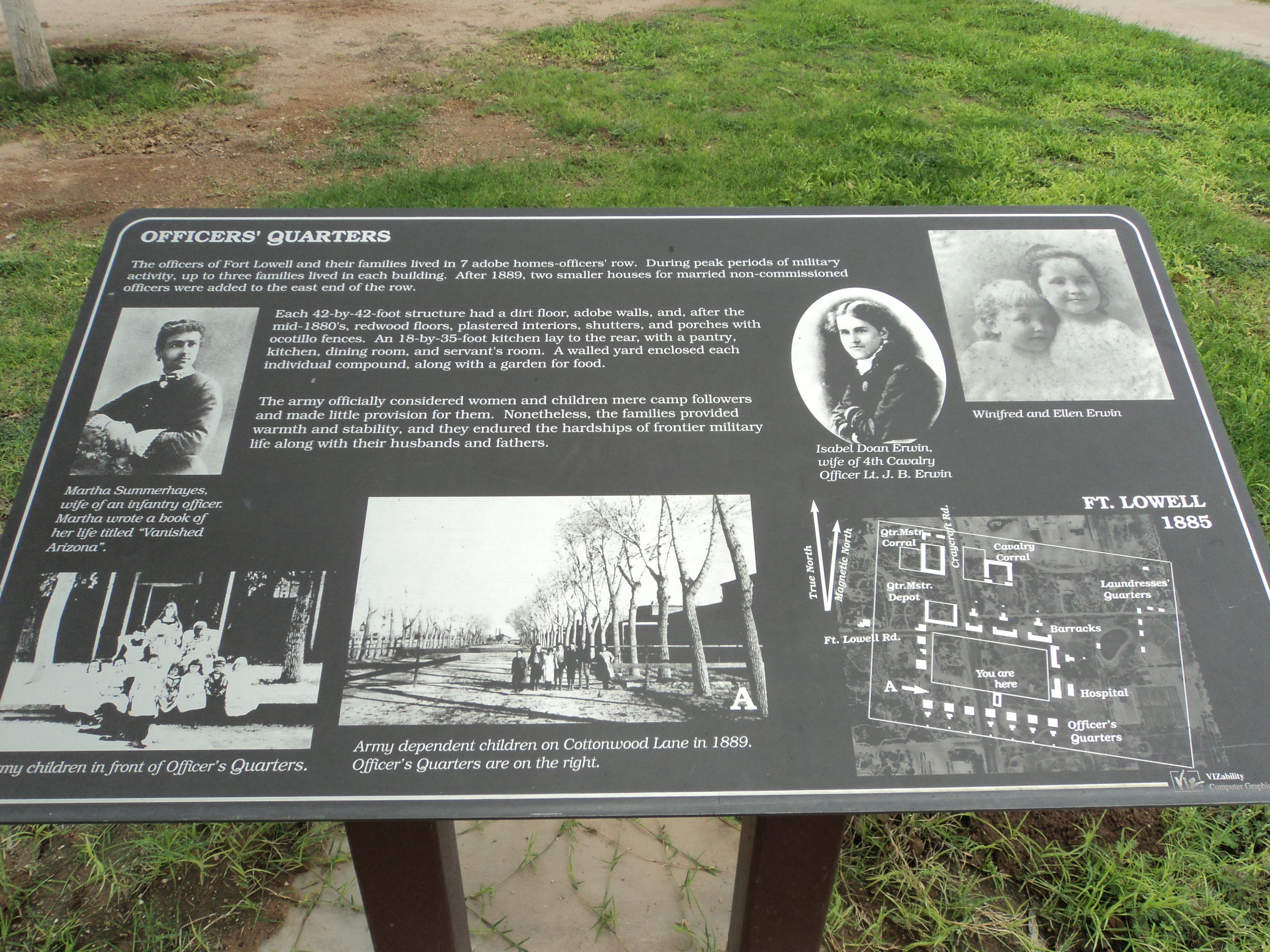
Information board on officers' quarters.

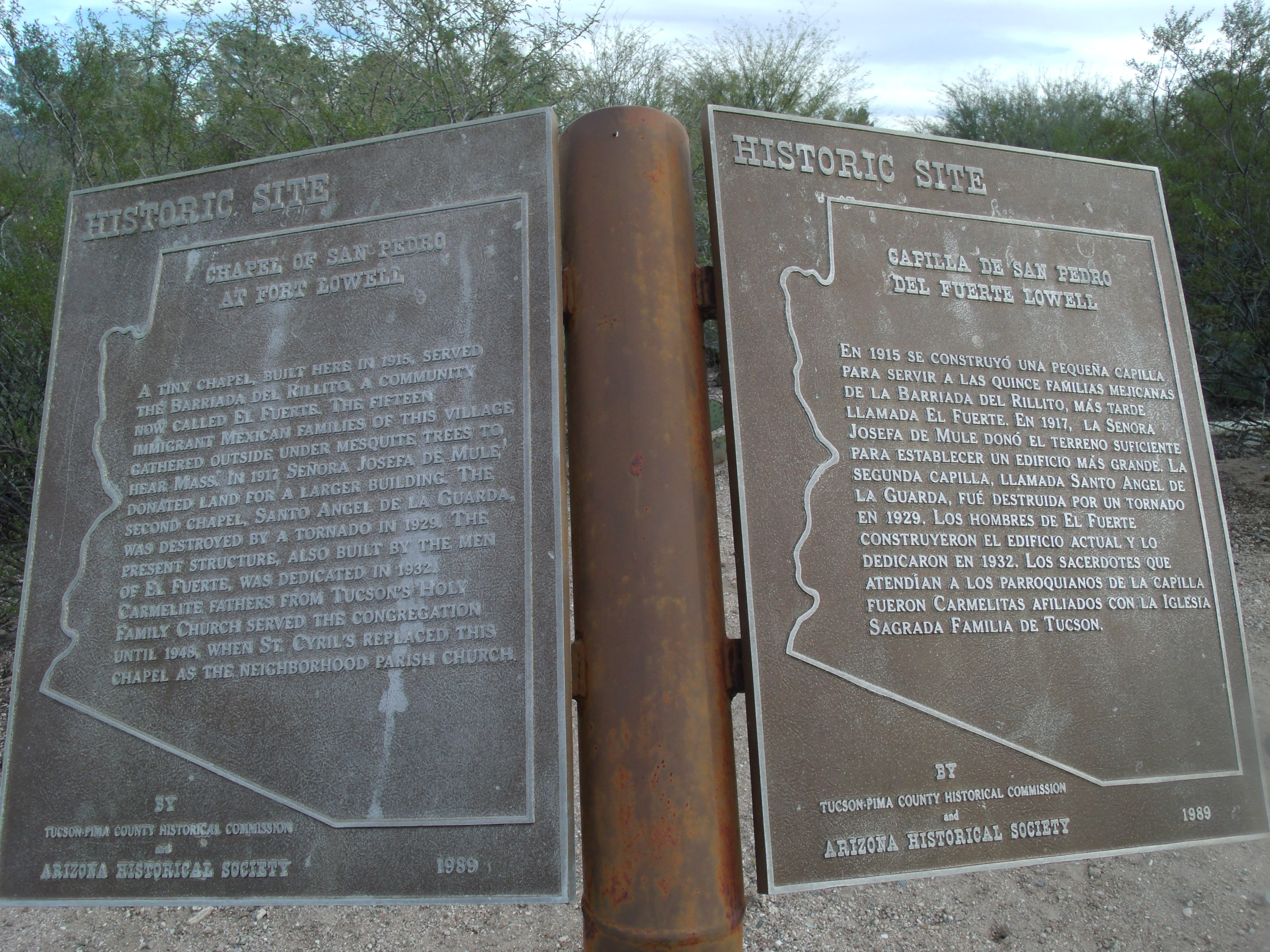
The San Pedro Chapel National Register of Historic Places Marker.

== See also ==
- Presidio San Agustín del Tucsón, a.k.a. Fort Tucson
