= El Callejón =

Historic Dirt Road in Tucson, Arizona, United States

El Callejón El Fuerte
- Neighborhood
- Country: United States
- State: Arizona
- County: Tucson
- City: Tucson
- Time zone: MST
- ZIP Code: 85712

El Callejón is a narrow dirt road in the heart of the Old Fort Lowell neighborhood and historic district in Tucson, Arizona, United States. This narrow lane was part of the post Fort "El Fuerte" village that was established in the 1890s and continued through the 1940s. The little road holds significant cultural, environmental, and ecological history, intertwined with the region's heritage and the families who called this place home in the 20th century. Private footpaths lead to an Acequia, an irrigation canal, called the Corbett Irrigation Ditch, which dates back to 1850s.

Situated in the eastern part of the Rillito Valley, El Callejón was originally settled as a ranchería—a community of dispersed, often widely separated but inter-related homes and families, characteristic of northern Sonora and southern Arizona. It came to be known as the village of El Fuerte. The residents, many of whom were interrelated, lived a lifestyle closely connected to the land and its resources.

Today, El Callejón not only provides access for residents but also serves as a link to the adjacent and nearby wash and riparian floodplain ecosystems. Six homes along El Callejón, along with the velvet mesquite floodplain ecosystem, are designated as Historic Sites, reflecting the rich historical significance of the area.

== Historic Properties ==
=== La Tiendita ===
La Tiendita, or "Little Store," was built out of sun-dried adobe bricks by Manuel Lujan and his brother Juan in 1947. It was intended to serve as a community center and grocery store for the El Fuerte community, La Tiendita's lifespan was short-lived, coinciding with the decline of the El Fuerte community due to environmental challenges such as dropping water tables and the cessation of the Rillito River flow. Manuel Lujan and his family eventually moved to Yuma in search of work, marking the end of an era for La Tiendita. The building at one time served as a studio for industrial designer and artist Giorgio Belloli.

=== Juan Xavier House ===
Built in 1956 by Juan Xavier, a tribal leader and former cowhand and welder, the Juan Xavier House stands as a testament to indigenous heritage and cultural exchange. Xavier, born on the Tohono O’odham Indian Reservation, was known for his storytelling and his contributions to the neighborhood, including the construction of outdoor patios and adobe fireplaces. His house, nestled among velvet mesquites, reflects the traditional ranchería architecture of the region. Juan Xavier married Boston and Tucson socialite Gwyneth "Guyneth" Browne Harrington. Harrington served as a field specialist for the Indian Arts and Crafts Board of the Department of the Interior. Juan "Harvey" Xavier, was the son of Jose Xavier, who was the chief of the Choulic in the southern part of the Tohono O'odham nation and was the younger brother of Roy Harvey Xavier who served as president "chief" of the Tribal Council in the 1940s. Juan Xavier worked with the University of Arizona on archaeological expeditions.

=== Corbett Irrigation Ditch and Mesquite Bosque ===
The Corbett Irrigation Ditch, dating back to the 1860s, served as a lifeline for agricultural activities in the area. Fed by gravity from the Tanque Verde area, the ditch supported a thriving mesquite bosque, a remnant of the old Fort Lowell Mesquite Bosque. However, urban development and water scarcity have threatened the existence of both the ditch and the bosque, highlighting the challenges of preserving historical landscapes in a rapidly changing environment.

=== Hen-House Wall ===
The Hen-House Wall, once part of the Post Trader's Store / Las Saetas chicken house, symbolizes the entrepreneurial spirit of early settlers. Built by John Pie Allen in 1873, the wall provided ventilation for the chicken coop and nearby horse stables. Over time, the wall became incorporated into Juan Lujan's house, showcasing the adaptive reuse of historic structures within the community.

=== Proto and Felícitas García House ===
Built in the late 1950s, the Proto & Felícitas García House represents the multi-generational ties and cultural traditions of the El Callejón community. Proto and Felícitas García, immigrants from Mexico, bought the land and became an integral part of the neighborhood. Their house served as a gathering place for family and community events, preserving traditions such as La Reunión de El Fuerte and the Mariachi Mass. Today, the house remains a cherished memorial to their legacy, owned and inhabited by their descendants.

=== Cuauhtémoc García House ===
Originally built in 1932 by Juan Lujan, the Cuauhtémoc García House became home to Cuauhtémoc and Felícitas García in the mid-1950s. Cuauhtémoc, a skilled carpenter and miner, contributed to the restoration of historic structures in the neighborhood, including the Las Saetas and the El Cuartel Viejo. His craftsmanship and dedication to preserving heritage were evident in the construction of a beautiful capilla in front of his house, honoring his wife and mother.

== Recognition ==
The cultural resources of El Callejón were designated a contributing property to the Pima County Fort Lowell Historic District in 1976. This recognition marked the significance of El Callejón's historical and cultural heritage within the broader context of the region's history. The properties are today included in the City of Tucson Fort Lowell Historic Preservation Zone, designated in 1981. This zoning designation underscores the ongoing commitment to preserving and celebrating the rich heritage of El Callejón for future generations to appreciate and enjoy. Each year since 1981, in February the Old Fort Lowell Neighborhood holds Fort Lowell Day & La Reunion de El Fuerte to celebrate the rich history of the people and place. The annual event is a reunion of neighbors and families who have called this palace home and includes a self guided tour of the historic properties in the area for the public which includes stops in El Callejón and access to otherwise private walking paths.
