= San Pedro Chapel =

- U.S. National Register of Historic Places
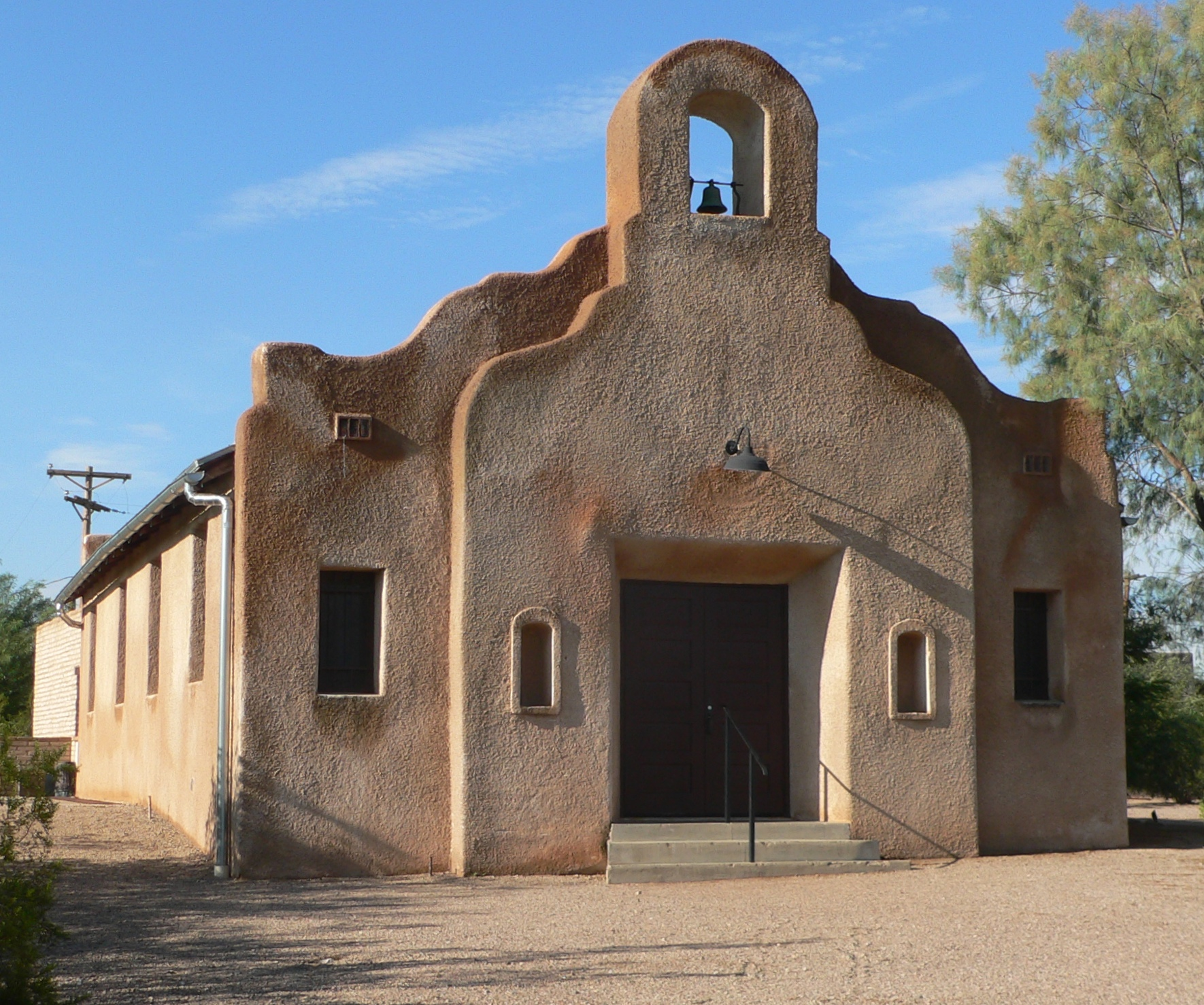

- Location within Arizona Location within the United States
- Location: 5230 E. Ft. Lowell Rd., Tucson, Arizona
- Coordinates: 32°15′40″N 110°52′47″W
- Area: 1.9 acres (0.77 ha)
- Built: 1915
- Architectural style: Mission/spanish Revival
- NRHP reference No.: 93000306
- Added to NRHP: April 28, 1993

San Pedro Chapel, located in the Fort Lowell area of Tucson, Arizona, is a historic and iconic architectural site with deep roots in the local community, dating back to the early 20th century. The adobe chapel was established by Mexican and Sicilian immigrants who settled in the area after the abandonment of Fort Lowell by the U.S. military. The center of a small settlement known as "El Fuerte," this area grew into village with rich cultural traditions. The chapel served as a cornerstone of community life and together with the Fort Lowell School House, the 1917 adobe Fort Lowell Union Church, and nearby small adobe houses made up the informal plaza and center of the community.

== Founding family: Egnazio and Gios Mulé ==
Egnazio Mulé, a Sicilian immigrant, seeking better health migrated from San Jose, California arriving in Fort Lowell around 1908. He and his wife, Gios, established a store, a truck garden, and homesteaded the quarter section of land that would eventually house the San Pedro Chapel. Egnazio was appointed postmaster of Fort Lowell in 1911 but tragically died shortly after, at age 38, due to pneumonia. The day of his death, the store he and his wife operated was burglarized but Gios continued to live in the area and became a key figure in the construction of religious buildings that served the community.

Gios’s vision and generosity played a significant role in the development of San Pedro Chapel. She was integral to the construction of three religious structures: La Capillita (1915), a substantial adobe church building (1916), and eventually San Pedro Chapel (1932). She gifted the land that all three structures were built upon.

== La Capillita ==
Built about 1915, La Capillita was the first religious building on the San Pedro Chapel property. The men of the neighborhood erected a tiny structure – eight by nine feet – from adobes made on the land. Large enough to hold just a simple altar and a priest, it was served by a Carmelite father who came out from Holy Family Parish near downtown Tucson every month or so. The communicants gathered in front under the shade of mesquite trees.

== Iglesia del Rillito & La Capilla de Fort Lowell ==
The first full chapel was constructed in 1916 and had a number of names including “Iglesia del Rillito”, “Iglesia de Fort Lowell” “La Capilla del Rillito”, and “La Capilla de Fort Lowell”. La Capilla was blessed by Bishop Henry Regis Granjon, on Sunday October 8, 1916. Rev. Father Duval, priest of the Cathedral of Saint Augustine (Tucson, Arizona) said the mass, El Tucsonense noted at the time, “The chapel was definitively established, and although it does not have a regular staff for now, the Carmelite fathers will attend the religious services that it demands.”

In the 1920s, the village of Fort Lowell was a vibrant hub of rich cultural traditions. Each year, the community came alive with celebrations and festivities that centered around the chapel including:

- June 13: The celebration of San Antonio de Padua.
- October 3: The lively fiesta of Los Santos Ángeles.
- May 15: The annual mass in honor of San Isidro, the patron saint of the Rillito.

Tragedy struck. On August 4, 1928, El Tucsonense reported that Fort Lowell Chapel was destroyed by a cyclone. “The roof was blown off at a very long distance, some of the walls were destroyed, and the images were torn from their place and also carried away from the Chapel.”

== La Capilla de San Pedro / St. Peters Chapel ==
In the throes of the depression, the community came together to rebuild the church. Led by Mulé, the men of the village began construction on what would become San Pedro Chapel. The adobes were handmade on-site, with local men working during their spare time, often on weekends. The chapel was completed in 1931 and named San Pedro Chapel in honor of Saint Peter. The building was designed in a Mission Revival/Spanish Revival style.

The new chapel was built over the ruins of the destroyed chapel facing north looking towards the Santa Catalina Mountains. The San Pedro Chapel, also known as San Pedro de Fort Lowell (St. Peter's at Fort Lowell Mission), was listed in the National Register of Historic Places on April 28, 1993, ref.: #93000306. It is also listed as a City Historic Landmark.

The chapel was dedicated on September 27, 1931 at 4 o'clock by Rev. Daniel James Gercke D.D. bishop of the Tucson Catholic Diocese.

== Later years and restoration ==
For nearly two decades, San Pedro Chapel was a central place of worship for the community. However, in 1948, with the opening of St. Cyril's Church in Tucson, the chapel was deconsecrated and fell into disuse. For a short period, it served as a movie house and later stood empty, occasionally being used by local children as a haunted house.

In 1965, abstract expressionist artist and dancer Nik Krevitsky purchased the deconsecrated Chapel; that year, he converted the building into a residence, art studio and gallery. Krevitsky began renovating the chapel, humorously dubbing it "Mission Impossible."

== Historic designation ==
In 1982, the City of Tucson recognized the significance of San Pedro Chapel by designating it as the city’s first historic landmark. It was subsequently placed on both the State and National Register of Historic Places, cementing its importance as a symbol of Tucson's multicultural heritage.

== Cultural significance ==
Throughout the early 20th century, the village of Fort Lowell was a hub of cultural activity, with annual celebrations of religious feasts such as San Antonio de Padua (June 13), Los Santos Ángeles (October 3), and San Isidro (May 15), the patron saint of the Rillito.

San Pedro Chapel and the earlier chapels were instrumental in serving the spiritual needs of the tight-knit community of El Fuerte, which was composed of families primarily from Sonora and Baja California. The chapel remains a testament to the resilience and cultural heritage of the community.

== Modern use ==
Today, San Pedro Chapel is no longer used for religious services but serves as a center for Old Fort Lowell Neighborhood Association, activities and community events. The brass bell, gifted by Mrs. Stephan Claflin and originating from a mission church in the Caribbean, still hangs in the chapel's bell tower, and the pews, made from missile crates by neighbor Cuauhtémoc García, are a reminder of the community's resourcefulness and dedication. Pima County supported the conservation of the building and the construction of a support building on the site with 2004 voter approved Bond Funding.

The property is owned by the 501(c)3 Non-Profit Old Fort Lowell Neighborhood Association and is rented for weddings, events and used to host lectures, fundraisers and special events throughout the year.

San Pedro Chapel stands as a lasting monument to the cultural and historical fabric of Tucson, preserving the legacy of the people who built it.

== Gallery ==
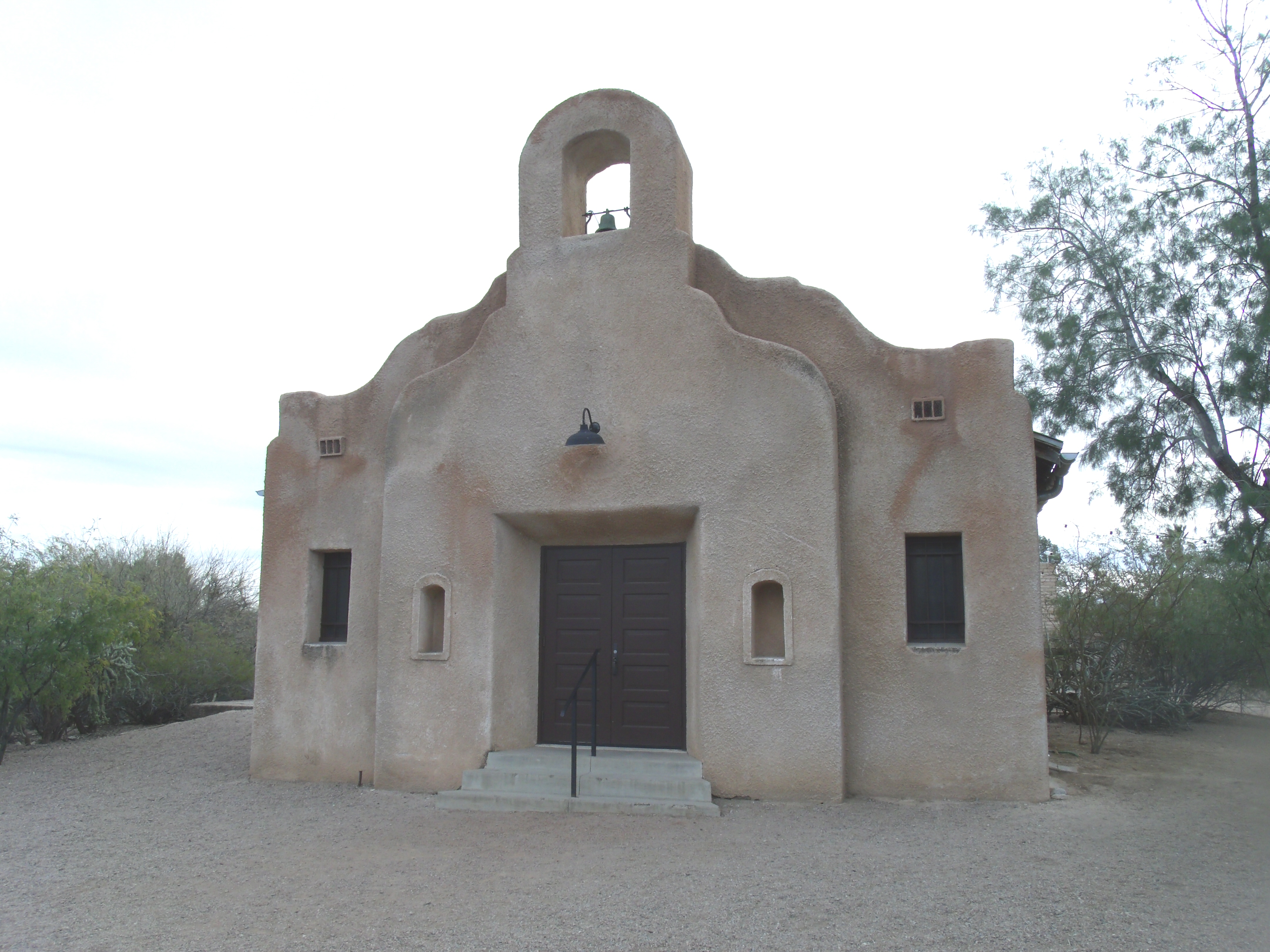
Different view of the San Pedro Chapel.

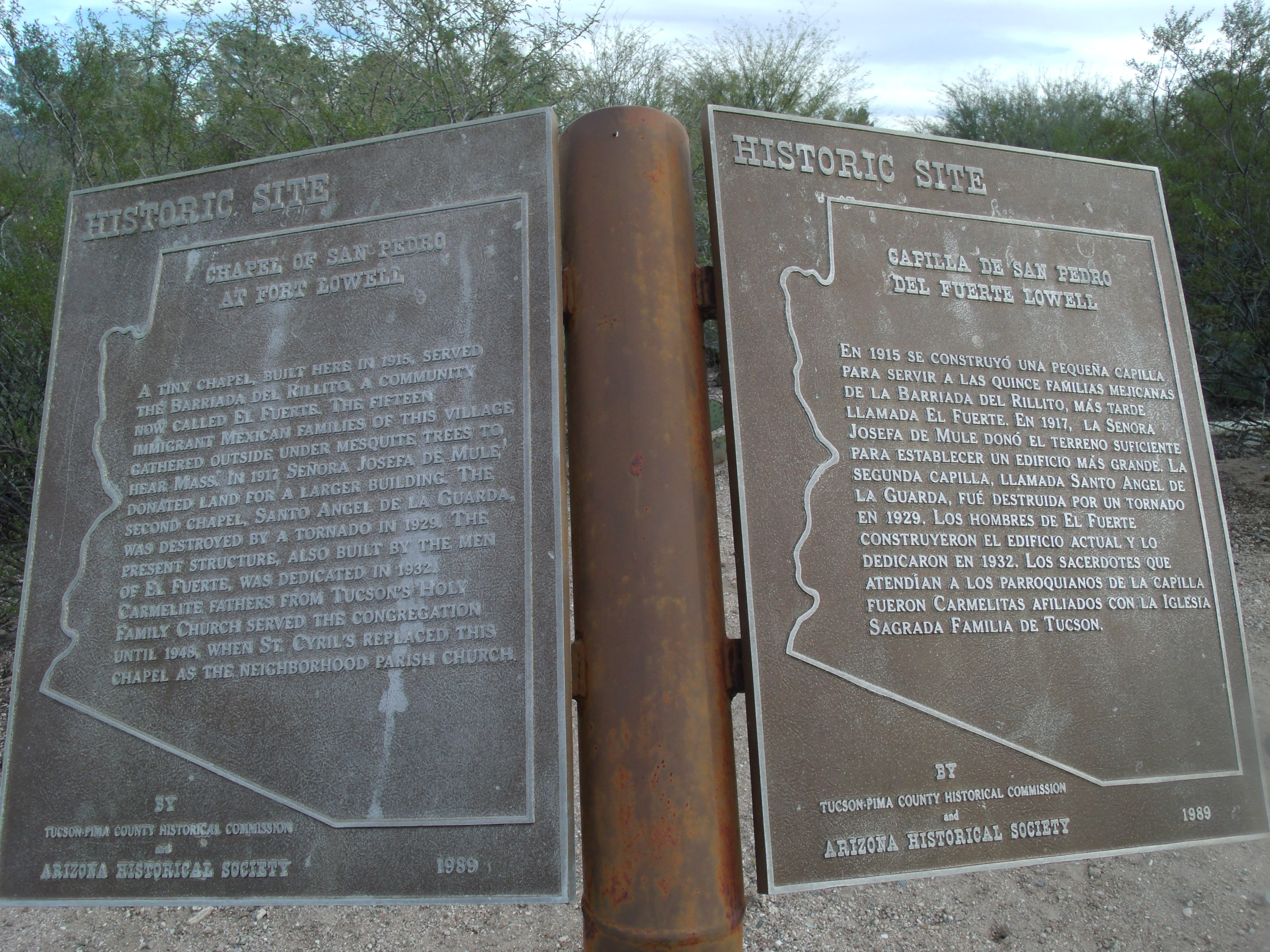
San Pedro Chapel National Register of Historic Places Marker.
