= René Cheruy =

- Born: René Cheruy; 1880; France
- Died: 1965 (aged 84–85); Tucson, Arizona
- Known for: Art; Watercolor; Printmaker fabric arts Costume Design

René Cheruy (1880-1965) was a soldier, educator and artist who served as a secretary to French sculptor Auguste Rodin, was a professor of French language and literature, was decorated by the French and British governments receiving the Croix de Guerre and the British Silver Military Medal for bravery in the field and was decorated with the Cross of the French Legion of Honor by French President Charles de Gaulle for his service to the French government during and after World War I. He was married to costume designer, artist and educator Germaine Cheruy and lived in the Art Colony of old Fort Lowell.

== Life ==
René Cheruy was born in Charleville, France in 1880. He attended the Sorbonne in Paris and worked as secretary to Auguste Rodin from 1902 until 1908. The details of his work with Rodin was published in the Hartford Courant in 1926. His time with Rodin brought him into close contact with the art world of Paris in the late nineteenth and early twentieth century.

In 1909 Cheruy moved to the United States as a teacher of French language and literature. He returned to France at the outbreak of World War I and spent four years with British forces in France as an interpreter. He was decorated by the French and British Governments, receiving numerous medals. At the end of the war, Cheruy returned to the United States and for many years was head of the Department of French at the Loomis Preparatory School in Windsor, Connecticut.

In the 1920s he showed water colors and woodcuts with the Ferargil Gallery in New York.

In 1924 he returned to France and married Germaine Cheruy

He was a founder of Le Salon Francais of Tucson and at the time of his death vice president of that organization. He wrote numerous articles on art and related subjects and was preparing his memoirs, in which he planned to discuss his time with Rodin.

Cheruy died in Tucson on May 26, 1965.
