= Rosamond Spicer =

American anthropologist

- Born: October 24, 1913; Bryn Athyn, Pennsylvania, U.S.
- Died: December 7, 1998 (aged 85); U.S.
- Occupations: Anthropologist and writer
- Notable work: People of Pascua (1988) and The Desert People with illustrations of photographs mostly taken by her

Rosamond Spicer (October 24, 1913 – December 7, 1998) was an American anthropologist and a writer. She worked with her husband Edward Holland Spicer (known as "Ned") who was a very well known anthropologist who authored many books which included the book which she had jointly edited titled People of Pascua (1988) which included a section by her titled Living in Pascua, Looking Back Fifty Years.

Edward H. and Rosamond B. Spicer Foundation has been established by the family members of the Spicer family and anthropologists in Arizona in honour of Ned and Roz Spicer, as they were popularly known, in the field of applied anthropology. This Foundation, associated with the Arizona State Museum, is engaged in making use of the archive of Spicer’s work which Roz Spicer had compiled after death of Ned to enable further "applied research and practice in anthropology."

== Biography ==
Rosamond Spicer was born Rosamond Pendleton Brown on October 24, 1913, in Bryn Athyn, about 16 miles (26 km) north of downtown Philadelphia, Pennsylvania. She was the daughter of Dr. Reginald W. Brown and Augusta Pendleton Brown, the latter being the daughter of William Frederic Pendleton. Her religious following was Swedenborgianism or the Church of the New Jerusalem, with rituals similar to that of Episcopal or the Catholic church. Her initial education was classical and included study of Hebrew, Latin, Greek and French - her father was also a scholarly person. In 1929, she had visited the West Coast, Canada and Mexico with her father and she spent her summers in old huts on the shores of lakes or sea. During two summers she had learned about ancient Egyptian pottery working at the University of Pennsylvania Museum. She also pursued lessons in modern dancing for performing with the Philadelphia Orchestra.

Spicer's higher education was at the Northwestern University on the subject of cultural anthropology under the guidance of Melville Herskovits, from where, in 1934, she obtained a degree in archaeology. She continued her studies at the University of Chicago in 1938 to receive a Master's degree in anthropology. She also studied Near Eastern history and hieroglyphs at the Chicago's Oriental Institute. She married Edward Holland Spicer on June 21, 1936, in Glenview, IL, after they had met at the Department of Anthropology at the University of Chicago where he had joined to pursue his s higher studies. Ned who joined the University of Chicago to pursue his doctoral degree in social anthropology under a full scholarship. But he did not have any enough money to sustain. It was then that Rosamond P. Brown and her friends shared their supper every evening with Ned. This association flowered into permanent marriage alliance between Rosamond and Ned. Together they had three children, Barry, Penny, and Lawson. She died on December 7, 1998.

Spicer, along with her husband Ned studied the life style of Yaqui Indians for one year. Yaqui Indians had lived an independent life in the United States, distinct from the Mexicans, but observing elaborate ceremonies at Easter. Their assimilation with American economic life was superficial. Here they learned the Spanish and Yaqui language and interacted with people extensively. They learned the native religious ceremonies of birth, naming of children, funeral and others, and also dance forms such as Matachin pole dance which gave them an insight into the Yaqui life and culture.

Spicer edited, along with Kathleen M.Sands, the book titled People of Pascua (1988) written by Edward H. Spicer and published by the University of Arizona Press. This book includes illustrations of pictures of Yaqui life and people during their stay there. The book was published 38 years after the first draft was written by him based in his field work during 1936 to July 1937 and in the early 1940 to summer of 1941, when Roz was also part of his work in Tucson, Arizona. She worked on this draft for three years, verifying the data as she was associated with him in the two field studies when they lived in Pacua. She has also recorded a chapter in this book titled Living in Pascua, Looking Back Fifty Years. The illustrations in the book are photos taken by Roz Spencer and David J. Jones.

From October 1942 to July 1943, she lived on the Tohono O'odham Reservation, known earlier as the Papago Reservation. She had lived Topawa, Arizona, in the "Feast House" with Barry, her son. The photos depicted daily life on the reservation and of special celebrations such as Rodeo and religious carnivals. The pictures with descriptions taken by her became part of the project sponsored by the Bureau of Indian Affairs (BIA) and the University of Chicago Committee on Human Development Indian Education and Research. The project resulted in a book titled The Desert People authored by Spicer, Alice Joseph, and Jane Chesky, in which the most illustrations provided are the pictures taken by Spicer. She revisited this reservation during the 1950s and 1960 to take pictures of photos of the Tohono O'odham.

Rosamond Spicer and her husband left a valuable set of records with Special Collection of the University of Arizona under the title "U.S.War relocation Authority Record" and also with the Arizona State Museum. She provided material which was of greater historical value as it was based on her diary notes during her life in Poston.
