= Edward H. Spicer =

American anthropologist

- Born: Edward Holland Spicer; November 25, 1906; Cheltenham, Pennsylvania
- Died: April 5, 1983 (aged 76)
- Occupation: Anthropologist

Edward Holland Spicer (1906–1983) was an American anthropologist who combined the four-field approach outlined by Franz Boas and trained in the structural-functional approach of Radcliffe-Brown and the University of Chicago. He joined the anthropology faculty at the University of Arizona in 1946 and retired from teaching in 1976. Spicer contributed to all four fields of anthropology through his study of the American Indians, the Southwest, and the clash of cultures defined in his award-winning book, Cycles of Conquest. Spicer combined the elements of historical, structural, and functional analysis to address the question of socio-cultural change. He was a teacher, researcher, editor, and practitioner, who applied his perspective to address the issues confronting the people he worked with.

== Early life: growing up and education (1906–1924) ==
Edward Holland Spicer was born on November 25, 1906, in Cheltenham, Pennsylvania, the youngest of three children born to Robert Barclay Spicer and Margaret Jones Spicer. The Spicers' first son died several years before their second son, William, known as Bill, was born. Edward, known as Ned, was born several years later.

In 1908, Robert, who was a Quaker, moved his family to Arden, Delaware, where he took a job as editor of the Quaker journal, The Friends Intelligencia. Arden was founded in 1900 by a Quaker group as a single tax community based on the principle of Henry George; there, Ned and Bill were exposed to the liberal economic and political ideas of the community. They participated in the local Shakespearean Theater every summer. Arden provided a pleasant rural setting in which the boys absorbed the intellectual atmosphere of the town.

Robert was fired from his editor's post because of his extreme liberal views. As a result, he turned to truck farming which introduced Bill and Ned to farming life. They helped with the daily raking and hoeing of the plants and vegetables. They tended to the animals of the farm, including goats and rabbits, and helped the household out by hauling firewood for the house and water from the town pump.

In keeping with the local practice, Margaret homeschooled the boys. The mothers in the community took in their neighbors' children for schooling in their homes for a month at a time, each month switching off with another mother. During this period, he learned to read and developed a lifelong love for books and writing. From his father, Ned learned about philology. By the time he was 12, he was copying words and texts of the Algonquin (Delaware) language. Ned displayed interest and curiosity in nature and the environment in and around Arden. He spent time learning and memorizing the scientific names of local plants and animals. Ned was homeschooled until he was 13.

Ned began his formal education when he was 13 years old. His parents enrolled Ned in the Friends School in nearby Wilmington. Ned commuted from home to the school by train daily for the next 3 years. His formal education continued in 1922 when his father moved the family to Louisville, Kentucky, after Robert took a job with the Society for the Prevention of Tuberculosis. Ned was enrolled at the Louisville Male High School.

While in Louisville, Ned developed an interest in sailing. He built a canoe and outfitted it with a sail, which he sailed and cruised in around the Ohio River. In February 1924, Ned graduated, left home, and enrolled in the Commonwealth College in New Llano, Louisiana. Commonwealth College was an experimental institution that featured classical and experiential training.

== Wandering: A period of exploration (1924–1932) ==
After 2 months, Ned and his friend Vic dropped out and went to New Orleans to find work as seamen. Vic found a job on a merchant ship and left Ned on his own until he found a job as a "cook's helper" on the Aquarius, a merchant ship sailing to Germany. Ned's first international travel brought him to post-war Germany where he visited Bremerhaven, Stettin and Hamburg where he witnessed a different world. Upon returning to Louisville he found his father Robert dying of cancer.

Following his father's death, he and his mother returned to Wilmington, where they found employment at the Greenwood Bookstore. Louisville had been a mixed period in Ned's life: while he enjoyed his experiences on the river and building of the boat, it was also a period of mixed emotions, introspection and self-doubt common to teenage boys. Ned turned 18 in November and continued to work at the bookstore until he found himself drawn back to the sea.

In early 1925, Ned returned to the sea, first as a crewman on the banana boat, Metapan, that left New Orleans for Puerto Barrios, Guatemala. According to his wife, Rosamond, that experience ended Ned's interest in eating bananas. Upon return he signed on to the ore ship, John C. Coolidge, on the Great Lakes. A seaman's strike later that year ended Ned's career as a seaman.

In the fall of 1925, Ned enrolled at the University of Delaware and planned to major in chemistry. He had enjoyed the chemistry classes in Louisville and thought of a career as a chemist with Dupont, there in Wilmington. He changed majors to literature and drama, which Ned's mother had encouraged her son to explore after he found the chemistry being taught at the university was not what he expected. During his time at the university, Ned joined the Footlight Club and acted in several plays. He joined the compulsory ROTC program, despite his Quaker upbringing, and rose to the rank of cadet Captain. He also studied German during his two years there.)

While at the University of Delaware, he wrote a paper entitled "Is there Race Superiority?" that awakened an interest in the social sciences. One of the courses he took was in economics. As a child, Ned and his brother, Bill, were raised in a socialist environment. He would later remark, "In my youth I had been strongly influenced ... by Scott Nearing, the radical economists at the Wharton School ... who was a friend of my father.".

During his sophomore year he heard about a new program at Johns Hopkins University in Baltimore, a Quaker institution. As part of the new program undergraduates were allowed to take graduate level courses before they had received their bachelor's degree. In the fall of 1927, Ned transferred to Johns Hopkins and switched to a social science major.

While in Baltimore, he lived with two maiden aunts, sisters to his father. He chose to take some of his social science courses at the graduate level. He found the liberal environment at Johns Hopkins welcoming and helped found a student club, The Young Radicals, where he served as president of the club that brought together students who had socialist leanings. He contributed the paper, "Theory of Hours and Production" to a graduate level seminar based on his experience during the seamen's strike.

At this time was also a period of introspection where he questioned his choices and goals, often expressing himself through poetry. In his second year at Johns Hopkins, he became disinterested in political economics. Despite a full scholarship, Ned dropped out of college in 1928 without completing his degree. Shortly thereafter he was diagnosed with symptoms of pulmonary tuberculosis, spending most of the year at the Maryland State Sanatorium.

While in the sanatorium, he worked in the hospital laboratory doing sputum analysis for all the patients of the sanatorium. He developed an interest in astronomy and spent nights in August and November charting meteor showers and sending his observations to the National Observatory in Washington, DC. Years later he would have an asteroid ("2065 Spicer") named after him for his help in 1955 negotiations between the Tohono O'odham Nation and the Association of Universities for Research in Astronomy in acquiring land for the Kitt Peak National Observatory on the reservation.

Ned left the hospital in 1928 and questioned what to do next. Opening a map of the US and closing his eyes, Ned stuck his finger on the map, where it landed on Arizona.

With help from his mother, he bought a bus ticket to Phoenix, where he found a number of jobs to support himself and a place to stay. Ned obtained a position with the Arizona Agricultural Inspection Service serving as an inspector in Yuma and in Salome, Arizona. Despite a diagnosis of "smallpox" which might have been "valley fever", he was able to continue his job, though he was quarantined at the Yuma Pest House. Meanwhile, he had decided to complete his BA in economics and saved money to go the University of Arizona. During the Great Depression the bank where he had placed his savings failed, and the job would be a lifesaver despite the crash postponing his plans for a year. By the end of 1930, he had saved up enough to enroll at the University of Arizona.

== Studying: University training (1931–1946) ==
In the fall of 1931, he enrolled at the University of Arizona and moved to Tucson. He learned that in order to complete his major in economics, only one advanced course in economic theory was needed. He completed his undergraduate course requirements and earned his BA degree with a major in Economics and Senior Honors.

While completing his BA course work, he enrolled in a course on southwestern Indians with Clara Lee Frapps (née Tanner). Dr. Dean Byron Cummings headed the Department of Archaeology at the university at the time and invited Ned to go with him on explorations for sites on weekends. These trips reinforced Ned's interest and skills in archaeology. He collected pot shards on these trips and brought them home to be sorted, cataloged, and analyzed, skills that would lay the foundation for his master's degree. In the summer of 1932, Ned worked on the King's Ruin site and wrote his MA thesis on King's Ruin, analyzing the pottery specimens from the site. He found that the "black on gray" motif was similar to other material found in the Upper Verde Valley. However, there was enough difference to identify them as a sub-class that he named Prescott black on gray. Ned worked on the Apache Reservation at the Kinishba site later that year.

During the 1932–33 school year, an opportunity developed to excavate at the Tuzigoot ruins. The Great Depression caused many miners to be let go by the United Verde Copper Company, a major employer in Yavapai County. To offset the resulting unemployment, Grace Sparkes, Chamber of Commerce secretary, envisioned excavation of ruins at Tuzigoot in Clarkdale, near Prescott, AZ.

Ned and Louis R. Caywood were hired for under the Federal Emergency Relief Administration (CWA), later known as the WPA. They organized the project with Ned as the dig's supervisor and Louis in charge of the lab. Ned's mother came out to help with the kitchen and housekeeping. Harry Getty later joined to help supervise the project. The project and partial reconstruction of the site was completed in 10 months, paving the way for the Tuzigoot National Monument.

When the Tuzigoot excavation was finished, Ned began working at the Museum of Northern Arizona. He collaborated with Drs. Harold S. Colton and Lyndon Lane Hargrave analyzing artifacts from Pueblo I pithouses in the San Francisco Mountains. In May 1933, Ned gave his first formal report on the pottery of the site at the meeting of the American Association for the Advancement of Science in Las Cruces, New Mexico (Watson Smith 1983: 76). At the time, Ned was deeply interested in an archaeological career, but not a Ph.D.

In the 1932–33 school year, Ned took courses that were taught by John Provinse, who joined the faculty at the University of Arizona to begin his first teaching job. Among the courses were "History of Anthropology" and "primitive society" . Ned observed that "in the classroom [Provinse] radiated a deep conviction that the social sciences ought to be used practically, and at the same time, fostered skepticism and caution about facile claims for them." (Edward H. Spicer 1966: 991)

Provinse encouraged him to pursue a PhD, with Ned later writing "John Provinse ... urged me to go to the University of Chicago. In an exploratory mood, I went and met [Alfred] Radcliffe-Brown and [Robert] Redfield. From then on I was under the spell of social anthropology."

Ned applied to the University of Chicago for the 1934–35 school year, where he was accepted and given a full scholarship. He worked for Redfield by cataloging and managing Redfield's office library.

In the winter of 1935, Ned had a hemorrhage and was taken to Flint Goodrich Hospital on the university campus. He remained there until the late fall of 1935 with a diagnosis of pulmonary tuberculosis. Ros later remarked that the doctors believed it was "valley fever" acquired in his days as an agricultural inspector. Neither Ned nor his family had the funds needed to pay the hospital, although Department Head Dr. Fay-Cooper "Papa" Cole found the funds to pay for the stay.

Cole suggested that Ros take notes for Ned and take them to him while he was in the hospital so that he could receive credit for courses. While he was in the hospital, Ned delved into readings such as Elementary Forms of Religion by Emile Durkheim. When Ned was released from the hospital, Redfield, Cole, and Provinse provided financial support and arranged for him to return to Tucson and work at the Arizona State Museum analyzing Indian skeletal materials. (RS 1990: 13)

In June 1936, Ned and Ros were married by her father in Chicago. They honeymooned in Tucson at the Yaqui village of Pascua and began their research on their respective theses. Ned's research project was suggested by John Provinse. Ros described their experience of moving in, learning the language, and creating a place in the local community.

The Spicers completed their field work in 1937 after which Ned began searching for a job. His contacts at the University of Chicago found him a fall semester opening at Dillard University, an all-Black College in New Orleans. Here, over the next two years, they experienced a very different world from that of the University of Chicago. Among the courses Ned taught at Dillard during this period were: "Primitive Society", "Minority Peoples in the US", and "The Concept of Race".

Between 1937 and 1939, Ned wrote a draft of his dissertation. After presenting the first draft to his dissertation advisor Redfield, he was devastated for weeks. According to Ros, Redfield observed, "This is fine as an ethnographic field report, but where is your thesis?" (R. Spicer 1990:13). Ned had to completely rewrite the dissertation, turning to Radcliffe-Brown for guidance in reshaping his dissertation. Ned was awarded his Ph.D. in 1939, and published his dissertation through the University of Chicago Press in 1940, as "Pascua, A Yaqui Village in Arizona". He and Ros began writing on a second book, "The People of Pascua", which was not completed at the time. Later, Rosamond completed and published the book posthumously in 1988..

In the fall of 1939, Ned took an interim position at the University of Arizona to fill in for Harry Getty who had gone back to the University of Chicago to finish his PhD studies. During this time, he met Malinowski, who was visiting the University of Arizona. They discussed Ned's interpretation of the Yaqui ceremonials, which Malinowski memorialized in a letter to Ned (quoted in Troy). As a result, Ned's structural-functionalism tended to shift from that of Radcliffe-Brown toward the Malinowskian perspective.

After acquiring his PhD, Ned completed his period of study and began his academic career. In the spring of 1940, he applied for a Guggenheim Grant to conduct research among the Yaqui in Sonora, Mexico. He received the grant and began his study in the fall of 1941. However, the study was cut short by the US joining World War II (WWII), as Mexico, declaring its neutrality, expelled all Americans from the country.

From 1941 until 1946 the Spicer Family experienced a transitional period. With the start of WWII, many US anthropologists became involved in the war effort. Ned became employed with the War Relocation Authority, charged with the removal and oversight of Japanese-American citizens and Immigrants from the U.S. West Coast. For Ned, it was his introduction to "applied" anthropology.

Like many social scientists and anthropologists, teaching and research activity was curtailed or redirected in the United States to serve the war effort. Ned served the war effort in the War Relocation Authority first as the community analyst at the Poston WRA Camp on the Poston Indian Reservation(?) under the leadership of Dr. Alexander Leighton. Later, the family would move to Washington, D.C., where Ned served as head of the Community Analyst Program within the WRA. While in Washington, he helped to form the Society for Applied Anthropology (SfAA). The new organization was led by his former mentor, John Provinse, who served as the first President (1941–44?).

With the end of the Second World War, many anthropologists returned to their academic careers. Others found new careers in the post-war world. Provinse tried to encourage Ned to seek a position in applied anthropology, but when offered a faculty position at the University of Arizona, Spicer accepted. This began his career for the next 37 years.

== Working: Career achievements (1946–1983) ==
With his temporary appointment to the Anthropology Department at the University of Arizona, Spicer began his career as a professional anthropologist. It was a career that would be broad in scope and influential on many fronts, as Ned was one of the last links between Boasian four-field anthropology and modern day theoretical and applied anthropology.

Early on in his career, he joined the American Anthropological Association (AAA). While in Washington, Spicer also joined the Society for Applied Anthropology (SfAA) as a founding member while it was headed by John Provinse as its president. He would serve as Vice President of the Society in 1946(?). He served as Vice President of the latter in 1947-48 and in 1976 the Society for Applied Anthropology honored Spicer with its Bronislaw Malinowski Award. Spicer's acceptance speech at its meeting in St. Louis was entitled "Beyond Analysis and Explanation? Notes on the Life and Times of the Society for Applied Anthropology".

Spicer viewed "applied anthropology" as a very serious and responsible activity throughout his working career. Unlike many of the "applied" anthropologists of the period he did not leave a behind a definitive school of thought followed by "students". Yet his impact is to be measured in the number of students that he trained in applied anthropology including Henry F. Dobyns, Art Gallagher, Jr., William S. King, and James E. Officer; in the number of situations he found himself involved in that called for an applied anthropological perspective; and the number of publications on the subject that he produced during his career from 1946 – 1983.

Among these were organizing and editing a series of symposia on the issue related to training in the application of anthropology to field situations. In the introduction to "Human Problems and Technological Change" (1952) he expressed his definition of applied anthropology in the following terms.

Changing people's customs is an even more delicate responsibility than surgery. When a surgeon takes up his instruments, he assumes responsibility for a human life. ... The administrator of a program of technological change carries a heavier responsibility. Whenever he seeks to alter a people's way of life, he is dealing not with one individual, but with the well-being and happiness of generations of men and woman.(p. 13)

The key concept that Spicer learned at the University of Chicago was the importance of "acculturation" in the study of societies and cultures and applying a structural-functional point of view. In "Perspectives in American Indian Culture Change," (1962), and "Ethnic Medicine in the Southwest", (1977) among other works, he led and edited seminars that explored this concept. Spicer chose teaching and research as the basis for his career, despite Provinse's urging that he make applied anthropology his career. Once he joined the faculty of the University of Arizona, he found a home where he could pursue his many interests, applied and academic.

His 100 publications show his commitment to the Yaqui tribe's history and socio-cultural dynamics. His community study "Pascua: A Yaqui Village in Southern Arizona" (1940) asked questions that called for a broader perspective, which led to his most successful project – Cycles of Conquest which won the Southwestern Library Association's 1964 award for Best Book on the Southwest. Cycles pointed to the complexity of the acculturation concept as it affected the contact between native peoples and different "conquerors". He was in the process of developing the ideas that came from that research at the time of his death. His wife, Rosamond published his thoughts on the subject in a paper entitled, "The Nations of a State" that appeared in 1992.

He served as Editor of the American Anthropologist from 1960 to 1963. He was elected president of the AAA in 1972 to serve as president for the 1973–74 term. He identified three major issues that the profession faced: first, "the old and possibly insoluble" problem of the integration of anthropology; second, the problem of understanding anthropologists in relation to the society in which they operate, particularly on the subject of jobs and the Committee on Ethics; and third, a widening of anthropology presences by international meetings that signified the internationalization of the discipline.

In 1978, he served on AAA's Committee on Anthropology as a Profession (CAP). The CAP discussed, among other matters, the recent proliferation of specializations in anthropology and the resulting loss of a sense of common direction among anthropologists. Spicer was one of two members of the Committee along with Eliot D. Chapple to prepare brief statements on this theme, which were published in the AAA's October Newsletter. This set in motion the reorganization of the AAA that would be completed in the 1980s.

In addition to the AAA, Ned occupied a number of roles within the Department of Anthropology, in the Tucson community (in particular the Fort Lowell neighborhood), the State of Arizona, and the national and international scene. According to the Worldcat.com in 2019, Spicer's contributions are represented worldwide by 102 works in 426 publications in 3 languages and 10,740 library holdings.

== Marriage and family ==
Spicer enrolled in the PhD program at the University of Chicago in the fall of 1934 where he met Rosamond Spicer (née Brown), a graduate student enrolled in the Master's program while working together on a departmental seminar on India in the basement of the main library. In June 1935 he married Rosamond in a service conducted by her father. They spent their honeymoon in Pascua Village in Tucson, where they conducted their field work for their respective degrees. She became a noted anthropologist in her own right. Together they had three children (Barry, Penny, and Lawson) and four grandchildren. Spicer died in Tucson, Arizona, on April 5, 1983, from cancer at the age 76.

== Legacy and honors ==
Spicer Awards and Grants

- 1935 Sigma Chi @ Chicago University of Chicago
- 1941 Guggenheim Award Research Yaquis in Sonora, Mexico
- 1955 Guggenheim Award Research Yaquis in Oaxaca, Mexico
- 1957 University of Arizona Award for distinguished teaching and/or research
- 1963 National Science Foundation senior fellowship Comparative studies in Mexico, Peru, and Ecuador of programs for Indian betterment,
- 1964 University of Arizona Award for distinguished teaching and/or research
- 1965 Southwestern Library Association "Best Book on the Southwest" award
- 1969 National Endowment for the Humanities Fellowship Fieldwork in Spain, Ireland, and Wales
- 1972 University of Arizona Award for distinguished teaching and/or research
- 1974 Election Presidency of the American Anthropological Association in 1974,
- 1974 Elected to American Philosophical Society Member
- 1975 Elected to the National Academy of Sciences Member
- 1976 Society for Applied Anthropology Bronislaw Malinowski Award
- 1978 University of Arizona Award for distinguished teaching and/or research
- 1979 American Anthropological Association's Distinguished Service Award
- 1980 Southwestern Anthropological Association's Outstanding Scholarship Award in 1980,
- 1983 Kitt Peak National Observatory Minor Planet (2055) Named "Spicer"named in his memory
