= Germaine Cheruy =

- Born: Germaine Rouget; 1896; France
- Died: 1980 (aged 83–84); Tucson, Arizona
- Known for: Art; Watercolor; Printmaker fabric arts Costume Design

Madame Germaine Rouget Cheruy (1896–1980) was a French costume designer, artist and intellectual who moved to the United States in 1924. She launched and taught art programs in private schools in Connecticut including the Loomis Chaffee School in Windsor, Connecticut. In 1939 she moved to Tucson, Arizona, and in the early 1940s purchased a home with her husband Rene Cheury in the artist colony of old Fort Lowell. She lived happily with her husband in Arizona. She was recognized and best known for wash drawing, etching, woodblocks, painting, costume design, weaving, fiber arts and arts education.

== Life ==
Cheury was born on January 11, 1896, in Constantine, Algeria,(1)<Arizona Naturalization Records, 1909-1991)> the daughter of a French General. A talented female artist, she was the youngest person to be elected to the French Salon, the Société Nationale des Beaux-Arts. Cheury learned Japanese paintings and prints, designed costumes of the Paris Opera and executed an extensive series of wash drawings of the Chartres Cathedral.

Cheury served as head of costume design for the Théâtre du Vieux-Colombier in Paris under famed early experimental director Jacques Copeau. She taught drawing and painting and took weekly classes with various artists including Raoul Dufy who during this period worked as the head of fabric design for Bainchini.

In 1924 Germaine married René Cheruy and moved to America. Rene who had worked for French sculptor Auguste Rodin had taken an appointment as head of the French department at the Loomis Chaffee School in Windsor, Connecticut, in 1919. When Germaine discovered there were no art classes she started classes at Loomis and later at the all girls Kingswood Oxford School in Hartford Connecticut. Students included the ground breaking west coast painter David Park. While at Loomis the Cheruy's lived in the old Phelps House. During this period her work was exhibited in galleries in New York City and Boston and Yale University and at the Fogg Museum at Harvard University in Cambridge, Massachusetts. In 1936 she showed watercolors and drawings at the Stavola Galleries in Hartford, Connecticut.

== Tucson ==
In 1939 “carrying two suitcases” Cheruy arrived in Tucson, Arizona, to spend the winter for her health. She rented a small house near Country Club and Speedway and described Tucson as a “wilderness” where “everybody was friendly, you never shut your door. In the good old time during the summer you would find two people on Congress Street. You could go to the movies for hours for 16 cents or the market with a dollar for the whole week's shopping.”

In 1941 she began teaching weekend and summer children art classes and sponsored an exhibit of her students work at the Tucson Center of Arts and Crafts.

Rene joined Germaine permanently in 1945 and as the City of Tucson continued to grow they moved further out first to Bellevue Street and Alvernon Way to be near what they called the “greasewood and quail” and then seven miles from downtown to the “mesquite” of the established artist colony in the old Fort Lowell District.

The American southwest desert city of Tucson provided Cheury with new areas of art to explore. She studied the style of painting found on old Mexican chests and spent hours researching at the Pioneer Historical Society (Arizona Historical Society). Her work and interest in historical themes permeated this period. In 1963 she said: “I was fascinated by the beginnings of Tucson.”

Cheury's well known work included a painted series of panels in a Mexican Style installed in the Old Adobe Patio in the Historic Landmark the Charles O. Brown House. In this work Cheury choose several prosaic historic scenes from Tucson past including the first ice cream in city, pie concession and two ladies trying to figure out whether coffee was meant to be fried.

The Cheury's were neighbors of painter and furniture maker Charles Bolsius. By the late 1950s at her home off Craycroft Road, Cheury she built a loom and practiced hand weaving and fiber arts.

Germaine Rouget Cheury died in September 1980 in Tucson.

Her work is included in the Graphic Arts Collection of the Department of Rare Books and Special Collections at Princeton University Library.

== Bibliography ==
- Sonnichsen, C.L., Tucson, The Life and Time of an American City, 1987.
- Szekely, Susan, Tucson Daily Citizen, Avant-Garde Theater, Charts Cathedral, Early Tucson - All Inspired Mme. Cheruy, 26 June 1963.
- Karel, David, Dictionnaire des artistes de langue française en Amérique du Nord, 1992.
- Falk, Peter Hastings, Who Was Who in American Art, 1564–1975, Three Volumes, 1999.
- Brooks, Gene, Tucson Daily Citizen, Joie De Paree Reigns at Rene's Adobe House, 18 May 1962.
