= Conway Griffith =

English-born American painter

- Born: Edwin Conway Griffith; June 10, 1853; Columbus, Ohio, U.S.
- Died: April 28, 1924 (aged 70); Laguna Beach, California, U.S.
- Resting place: Fairhaven Cemetery, Santa Ana, California, U.S.
- Occupation: Painter
- Parent(s): Collins W. Griffith, Kate Conway

Conway Griffith (June 10, 1853 - April 28, 1924) was an American painter. Born in Columbus, Ohio, he moved to California, where he co-founded the art colony in Laguna Beach, California. Griffith was an aquarelle, oil and watercolor painter. He was buried in the Fairhaven Cemetery in Santa Ana.
