= Ateliers Mommen =

Art colony in Saint-Josse-ten-Noode, Belgium

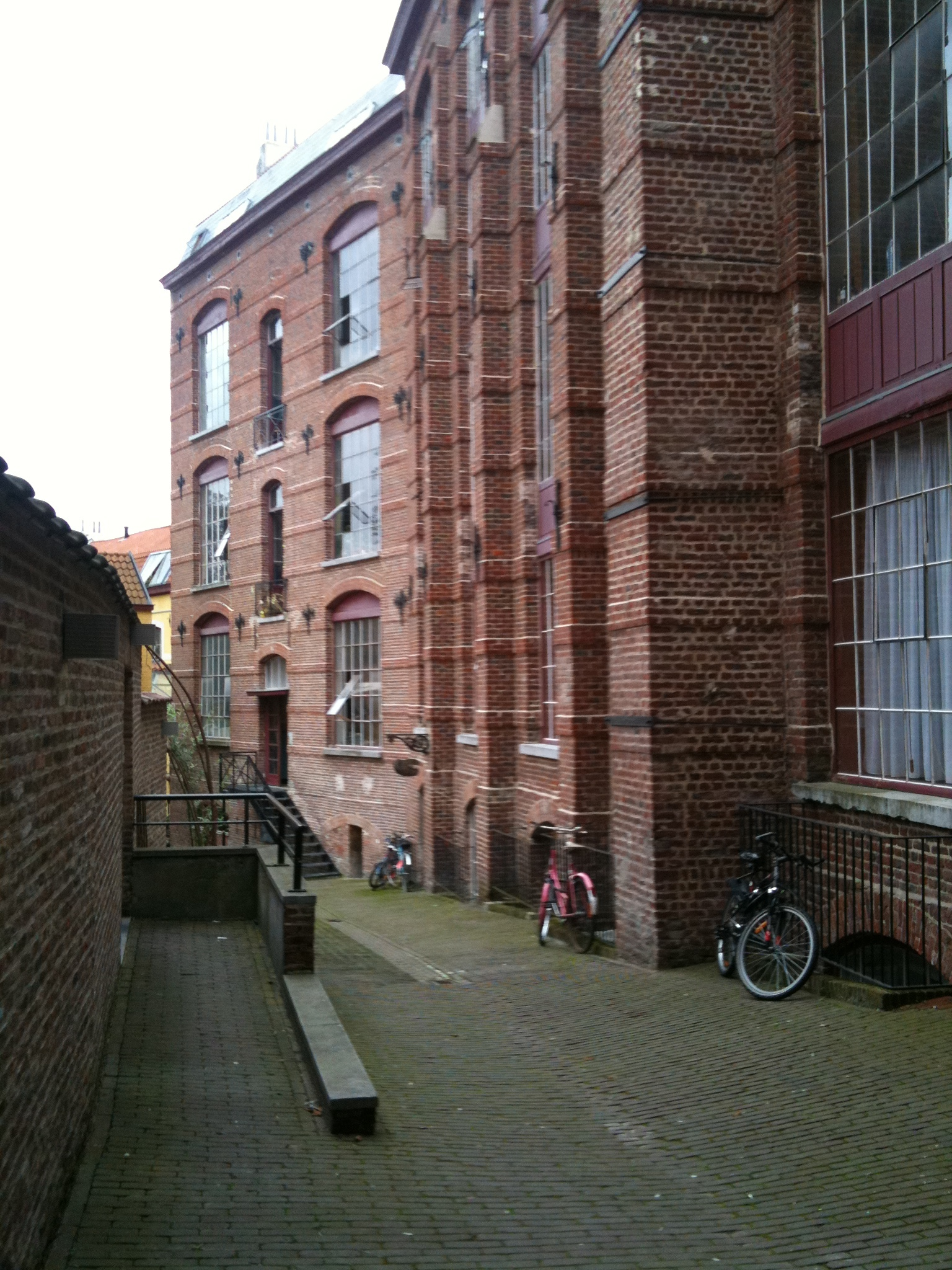
- Impasse de la Palette/Palletgang
- Former names: Établissements Mommen
- Alternative names: Cité Mommen

General information
- Status: Completed
- Type: Art colony
- Architectural style: Eclecticism
- Location: 37 Rue de la Charité/Liefdadigheidsstraat, Saint-Josse-ten-Noode, Belgium
- Coordinates: 50.84767°N 4.37073°E
- Named for: Félix Mommen
- Construction started: 1874
- Renovated: 1894; 1910
- Client: Félix Mommen
- Owner: Saint-Josse-ten-Noode

Design and construction
- Architect: Ernest Hendrickx

Renovating team
- Architects: Henri Van Massenhove; M. Deleuve

Website
- ateliersmommen.collectifs.net

Ateliers Mommen, also known as Cité Mommen and formerly as Établissements Mommen, is an artists’ colony in Saint-Josse-ten-Noode, a municipality of Brussels, Belgium. Established between 1874 and 1910, it comprises a complex of shops, dwellings, industrial-style workshops, and artists’ studios.

The site was created by Félix Mommen, an ébéniste, art materials merchant, and patron who promoted a notably modern vision of the artistic profession. Believing that artists should be autonomous yet shielded from everyday hardship, Mommen commissioned architects Ernest Hendrickx and Henri Van Massenhove to construct the ensemble, initially installing a materials factory and later purpose-built ateliers. The colony quickly became a meeting place for the Brussels artistic avant-garde of the early 20th century and remains tied to its founder’s legacy. It is considered one of Europe’s most notable preserved artists’ estates and the last active 19th-century artists’ colony in Brussels. The colony is now the only surviving house complex in Belgium, and one of the last of its kind in the world. Around 30 artists live and work in Ateliers Mommen.

Located at 37 Rue de la Charité/Liefdadigheidsstraat, behind the Charlier Museum, the complex is accessed through the façade of a 19th-century townhouse leading to a private lane known as Impasse de la Palette/Palletgang.

== History ==
The Maison Mommen was established in 1853 by Félix Mommen, a dealer in artistic materials and patron who supported artistic autonomy while providing protection from the challenges of daily life.

Construction of the complex took place between 1874 and 1910. The first building permit, submitted in May 1874, was for a workshop at the rear of the property, designed by architect Ernest Hendrickx. Five months later, a second permit was filed for a street-facing building with a shop on the ground floor and a residence above, as well as additional workshops in the courtyard for making pigments. Hendrickx, a former student in the Paris ateliers of Viollet-le-Duc under Anatole de Baudot, was influenced by French rationalist theories and designed numerous schools and model farms, including expansions at the Free University of Brussels, the Normal School of Drawing in Saint-Josse-ten-Noode, and the Industrial School of Brussels.

In 1894, architect Henri Van Massenhove built a building at the rear of the garden to house the artists’ ateliers, which were connected to a neoclassical house. The complex also included a gilding workshop, a smithy, storage for wood, stables, and a drying shed for canvases. Part of the buildings around the courtyard was purchased by the Lesigne printing company and partly demolished. In 1910, a wood storage building that also contained stables was converted into a workshop for canvas production, designed by architect M. Deleuve.

The ateliers featured large north-facing windows for consistent natural light and were rented at low prices or in exchange for artworks. A gallery was added to support emerging artists at a time when the academic Salon often rejected new artistic developments. Mommen also produced high-quality canvases, pigments and materials tailored to artists’ needs, creating a space for artistic creation, exchange, and collaboration.

In the early 20th century, the surrounding district became a hub of artistic activity. Collector Henri Van Cutsem, who lived nearby, hosted members of the Brussels avant-garde in his townhouse, now the Charlier Museum, which later acquired many works by artists active at the ateliers. The area became known as “the little Montmartre of Brussels,” attracting numerous painters and fostering intellectual and artistic exchange. Notable artists who worked at the Mommen Ateliers included Alfred Verwée, Jean-François Portaels, Emile Wauters, Léon Frédéric, Constantin Meunier, Fernand Allard l’Olivier, Théo van Rysselberghe, Henri Evenepoel, Xavier Mellery, and Pierre Paulus. The Maison Mommen also specialised in panoramic canvases, supplying materials for projects such as the Bourbaki, Cairo, and Congo panoramas, as well as Alfred Bastien’s Panorama of the Battle of the Yser. The ateliers thus became a central part of Brussels’ artistic and historical landscape.

Félix Mommen passed away in 1914. His son Joseph continued the family tradition until the 1950s and had married the artist Marguerite Ithier, whom he had met at the ateliers. After Félix Mommen’s death, the company continued its activities, focusing on the sale of materials and the framing and restoration of canvases. In 1922, the street-facing façade was altered, and the right-hand shop window was replaced by a door. From the 1950s, the company changed its name to Établissements De Wandel, discontinued the production of canvases and paint, and specialised in the manufacture of cinema screens. The firm remained active until the 1980s, but due to the reduction of its activities, certain buildings near Rue du Marteau/Hamerstraat and around the inner courtyard were sold, while the ateliers continued to be used by artists such as M. Dutrieux, M. Vosch, and P. Cordier. By the early 1980s, only three employees remained for production and restoration, but the artists’ colony of Mommen persisted and evolved naturally, with all buildings maintained and repurposed.

In 1988, the site was purchased by developers who planned to demolish it and build offices. The complex had been protected as a monument under the Royal Decree of 24 September 1992 for its historical and artistic value, forcing the developers to revise their plans. Warnings began in 2001, prompting some artist tenants to leave. In 2003–2004, the developer proposed a new project to build luxury apartments. In 2004, the non-profit Ateliers Mommen was founded with the goal of saving the Mommen artists’ colony from real estate speculation and preserving it in the long term as a residential and creative space. Artists appealed to the municipality for support to purchase the property through an “ethical buyout” to preserve its artistic activities, with the owners setting a price of three million euros. In April 2005, a financial arrangement was initiated, combining contributions from the municipality, the federal government, and the non-profit, with one year to complete the purchase. After acquisition, light renovations were planned. The site has been safeguarded since 21 September 2005 with the signing of a preservation agreement between the non-profit, the municipality, and the federal government. The municipality’s objective is to maintain the site’s dual artistic and social purpose, redeveloping it into approximately thirty combined ateliers and living spaces.

== Architecture ==
=== Exterior ===
The building on Rue de la Charité is an eclectic-style structure of three storeys and four bays under a slate mansard roof. The red brick façade is punctuated with bluestone details, fluted pilasters, arched windows, and a full-width wrought iron balcony. The ground floor includes a carriage entrance to the atelier courtyard and a shopfront with a 1922 door.

A narrow alley, historically known as Impasse de la Palette, connects the main building to three separate ateliers. The ateliers are brick constructions with mansard roofs, vertical buttresses, large window openings, and wooden balustrades. The woodworking atelier, built by architect Ernest Hendrickx, features symmetrical bays with arched openings, while the two-storey third atelier has wide upper-storey windows supported by a wrought-iron structure.

=== Interior ===
The interior comprises mezzanine levels within the ateliers. In the garden, a single-storey three-bay outbuilding under a shed roof functions as an atelier, known as "Le Cagibi." Opposite the woodworking atelier, a transverse three-storey brick building with a gabled roof was originally a storage and stable facility, remodelled in 1910 by architect M. Deleuve for the production of large canvases for panoramas. Its original stable façade survives, including the main door, an upper access to the hayloft, and an oculus in the gable. The building was partially acquired by the Lesigne printing press, and the adjacent structures belonged to the now-demolished press facilities.

The Ateliers Mommen functions as an artists’ community, combining residential and working spaces where art is continuously created and developed. The complex supports both artistic and social interaction, hosting painters, photographers, sculptors, performers, multimedia artists, engravers, scenographers, video artists, collagists, and textile designers, from internationally recognised professionals to emerging creators.

== Activities ==
=== Community and organisation ===
In 2004, the non-profit association Ateliers Mommen was established to preserve the site from real estate speculation and maintain it as a long-term residential and creative space. The association is structured into two complementary bodies: the Tenants’ Committee for internal matters and the Salon Mommen Committee for external artistic activities. Both operate independently under the supervision of the association’s board.

The Tenants’ Committee unites the residents to discuss internal and collective life and, in collaboration with the municipality, oversees participatory management of the site. It serves as the collective voice, an interface for communication, and a platform for shared decision-making.

The Salon Mommen Committee manages the artistic programme of the Salon, making the space accessible to residents and visiting artists. It functions as a venue for artistic creation, experimentation, and dissemination, emphasising experimental work, improvisation, in-situ projects, and interdisciplinary research, including music, visual arts, performance, installation, dance, and theatre. Programming encourages exploration of artistic meaning, the role of the artist in society, and the presentation of unfinished or work-in-progress pieces.

=== Facilities and artistic life ===
Studios and apartments are modular, north-facing, and equipped with technical infrastructure, ranging from 28 m² to 200 m², with moderate rents allowing artists to focus on creative work. Shared facilities include a garden, communal alley, bicycle and laundry areas, and the Salon Mommen, which hosts artistic events, exhibitions, and communal activities. The site encourages collaboration, exchange of knowledge, and joint projects while preserving the autonomy of each artist.

== See also ==
- List of museums in Brussels
- Culture of Belgium
