= Chansons gaillardes =

Song cycle composed by Francis Poulenc

- Song cycle by Francis Poulenc
- Poulenc in 1922
- English: Ribald songs
- Catalogue: FP 42
- Text: Anonymous authors, 17th century
- Language: French
- Composed: 1925–1926
- Dedication: Mme Fernand Allard
- Scoring: baritone; piano

Premiere
- Date: 2 May 1926
- Location: Salle des agriculteurs, Paris

The Chansons gaillardes (Ribald songs) FP 42, are a song cycle of eight pieces composed by Francis Poulenc in 1925–26 "in euphoria and post-war" on anonymous texts of the 17th century. The work was dedicated to Mme Fernand Allard.

This cycle was premiered in concert on 2 May 1926 at the Salle des agriculteurs, 8 rue d'Athènes in the 9th arrondissement of Paris, by Pierre Bernac, as a 26-year-old baritone virtually unknown, and Francis Poulenc, 27 years old, as the pianist. It was the memory of this first collaboration that would bring together Poulenc and Bernac several years later for many international tours, from 1934 to 1959.

== Composition of the cycle ==
The titles of the eight pieces, of which the tempi alternate quick and slow movements, are as follow:

1. "La Maîtresse volage" – Rondement
2. "Chanson à boire" – Adagio
3. "Madrigal" – Très décidé
4. "Invocation aux Parques" – Grave
5. "Couplets bachiques" – Très animé
6. "L'Offrande" – Modéré
7. 'La Belle Jeunesse" – Très animé
8. "Sérénade" – Modéré

== Analysis ==
Just out of the surrealist experience of Les Six, Poulenc dared to bring the bawdy songs into the concert halls. On the one hand, the text of Les Chansons gaillardes comes from anonymous texts of the seventeenth century, written in a tone of celebration and alcohol: "texts rather scabrous", according to Francis Poulenc himself. On the other hand, in the Journal de mes mélodies, Poulenc explains about them: "I hold this collection dear where I tried to demonstrate that obscenity can accommodate music. I hate ribaldry."

Most texts imply a particular play on words, a lightness in the form of code. For example, in the "Chanson à boire" (a different setting and a different text to Chanson à boire, 1922), the words celebrate "the kings of Egypt and Syria" because they "wanted their body to be embalmed, to last longer, dead", and conclude, Buvons donc selon notre envie ! ... Embaumons-nous ! (Let's therefore drink according to our desire! ... Let us embalm!")
