= Béla Pállik =

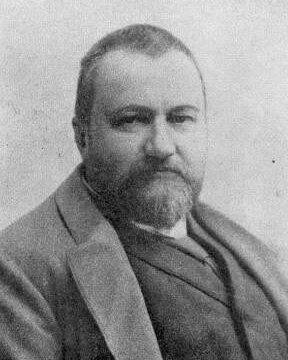
Béla Pállik (date unknown)

Béla Pállik (2 February 1845 – 27 July 1908) was a Hungarian artist, opera singer and theater director. He was best known for his animal paintings and was nicknamed "Birkapiktor" ("Sheep-painter").

== Biography ==
Pállik was born in Nagymihály. He went to Budapest to pursue his art studies and work in the studio of Adolf van der Venne, a German painter who was living there at the time. His parents were unable to support his studies for long, so he chose to support himself by selling copies of the old masters he made at the local museums, but eventually concluded that portrait painting would be most profitable. Soon after, he acquired an important patron; Count János Waldstein-Wartenberg, a well-known art collector.

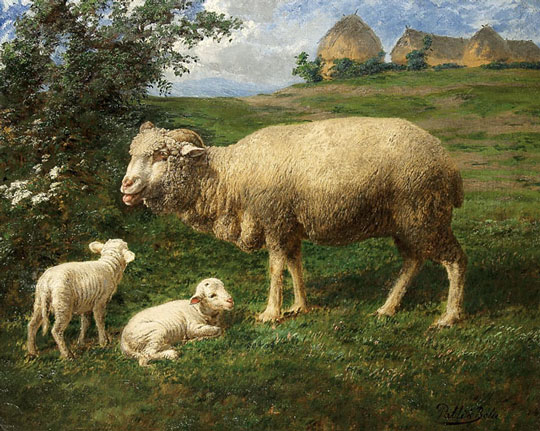
Lambs (before 1880)

He spent some time at the Count's estate in Várpalota, doing portraits, some of his first animal paintings and frescoes for the library at Zichy Castle. In 1867, he was able to enroll at the Academy of Fine Arts Vienna, thanks to a state grant that the Count was able to obtain for him from Prime Minister Gyula Andrássy. His primary instructor there was Eduard von Engerth.

In 1871, he received an extension of his grant and went to study at the Academy of Fine Arts, Munich, where his teachers were Wilhelm von Diez and Karl von Piloty. It was there that he decided to devote himself to animal painting. He had his first showing at the 1873 World Exposition in Vienna. In 1874, he returned to Budapest and soon became popular with the aristocracy, so he continued to do portraits along with paintings of their favorite dogs and horses.

=== Singing career ===
By 1880, he was successful enough to buy an old church, where he set up apartments and a studio. Unfortunately, the amount of work he had been doing created a severe case of eyestrain and, on his doctor's advice, he gave up painting for a while. Rather than remain inactive, he began to take singing lessons. In 1883, encouraged by his friends and family, he sold his studio (which later became a church again) and toured Germany; performing in several major cities, including Weimar, singing opera arias. He eventually learned thirty different operatic roles and was especially successful with the works of Richard Wagner. Düsseldorf became his base of operations and he spent his summers in Nordkirchen, at the Esterházy estates.

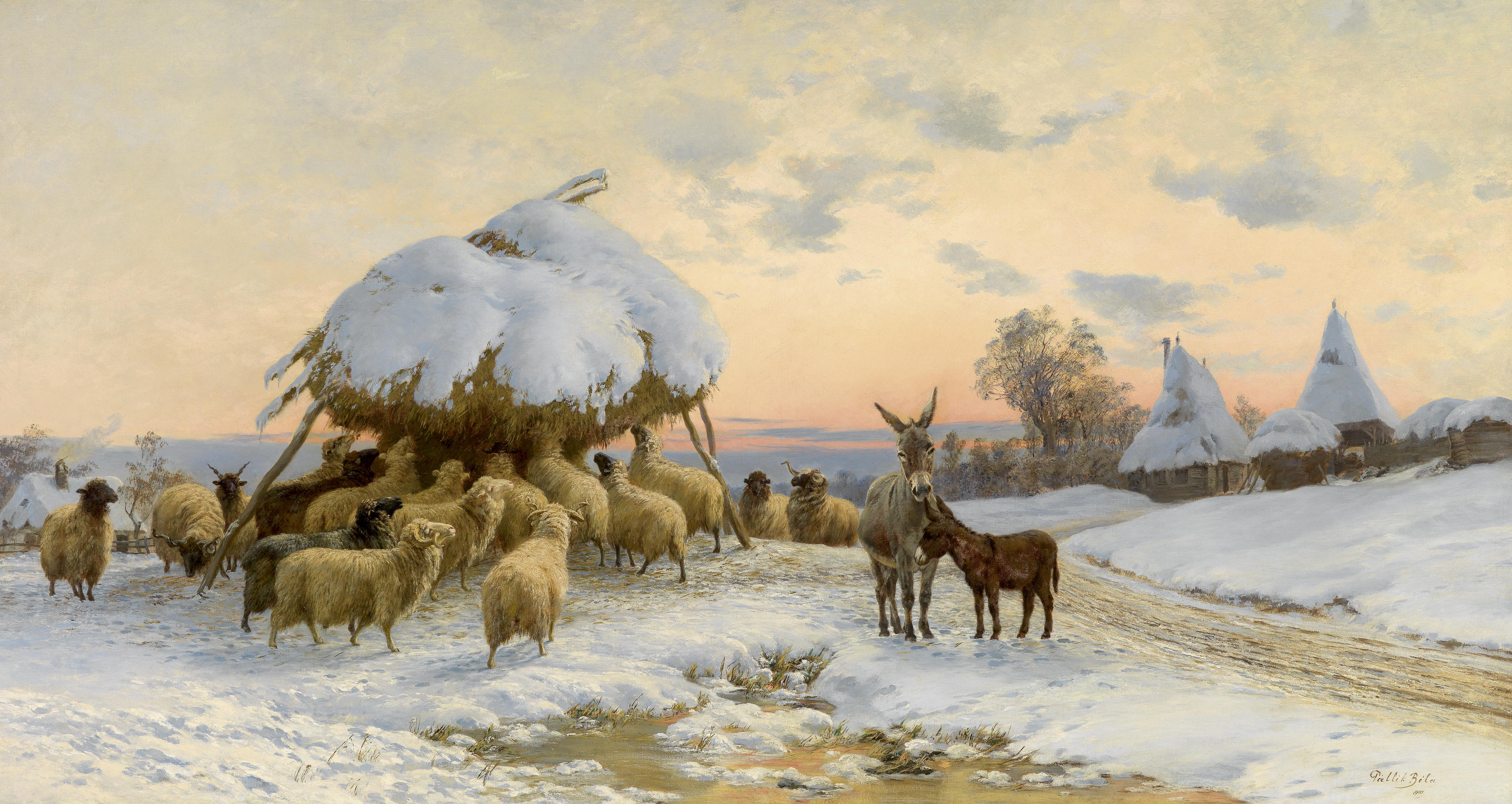
Wintertime (1901)

Once that he felt his eyes had sufficiently recovered, he had sheep brought to Düsseldorf and started painting again. With the help of Prince Nikolaus, he was able to re-establish himself in the art world. In 1887, he took up residence at the Esterházy Palace in Tata, where he continued to display his singing talent at the castle theater and directed some productions as well as painting the theater's ceiling. He also exhibited widely, including a show at the Salon in 1890. That same year, he acquired property in the Epreskert Art Colony and built a studio there. It is currently known as the "Atelier Kernstok" after a famous later resident, the artist Károly Kernstok.

Pállik died in 1908 in Budapest.
