= Colony Ramazzoti =

Annual art colony in North Macedonia

The International Art Colony "Ramazzotti" is an annual art colony held at the lakeside city of Ohrid in North Macedonia. The colony runs every August for up to 20 invited artists. The colony attracts artists from all of Europe and North America and finishes with an exhibition of the artists' work. The colony runs similar to many other East European art colonies, forming a mixture of sculptors, painters, wood carvers and photographers. The colony was founded in 2003 by Zoran and Blagorodna Josifov from Kavadarci of Macedonia.

Artists attending the 2008 colony were:

- Jure Cekuta, Slovenia
- John Chapman, US
- Gligor Chemerski, Macedonia
- Robert Cvetkovski, Macedonia
- Marija Dakovic, Bosnia
- Jovica Dejanovich, Serbia
- Dragan Dejanovich, Serbia
- Barbra Demshar, Serbia
- Desislava Deneva, Bulgaria
- Simonida Filipovska-Kitanovska, Macedonia
- Zhaneta Gelevska-Veljanovska, Macedonia-England
- Maja Dzartovska-Hill, England
- Ben Hill, England
- Ilija Kochovski, Macedonia
- Jana Kunovska, Macedonia
- Kasiopeja Naumovska, Macedonia
- Tome Mishev, Macedonia
- Dragan Radenović, Serbia
- Emil Shulajkovski, Macedonia
- Ilija Spasovski-Chendo, Macedonia
