= Art colony =

Place where artists live and interact with each other

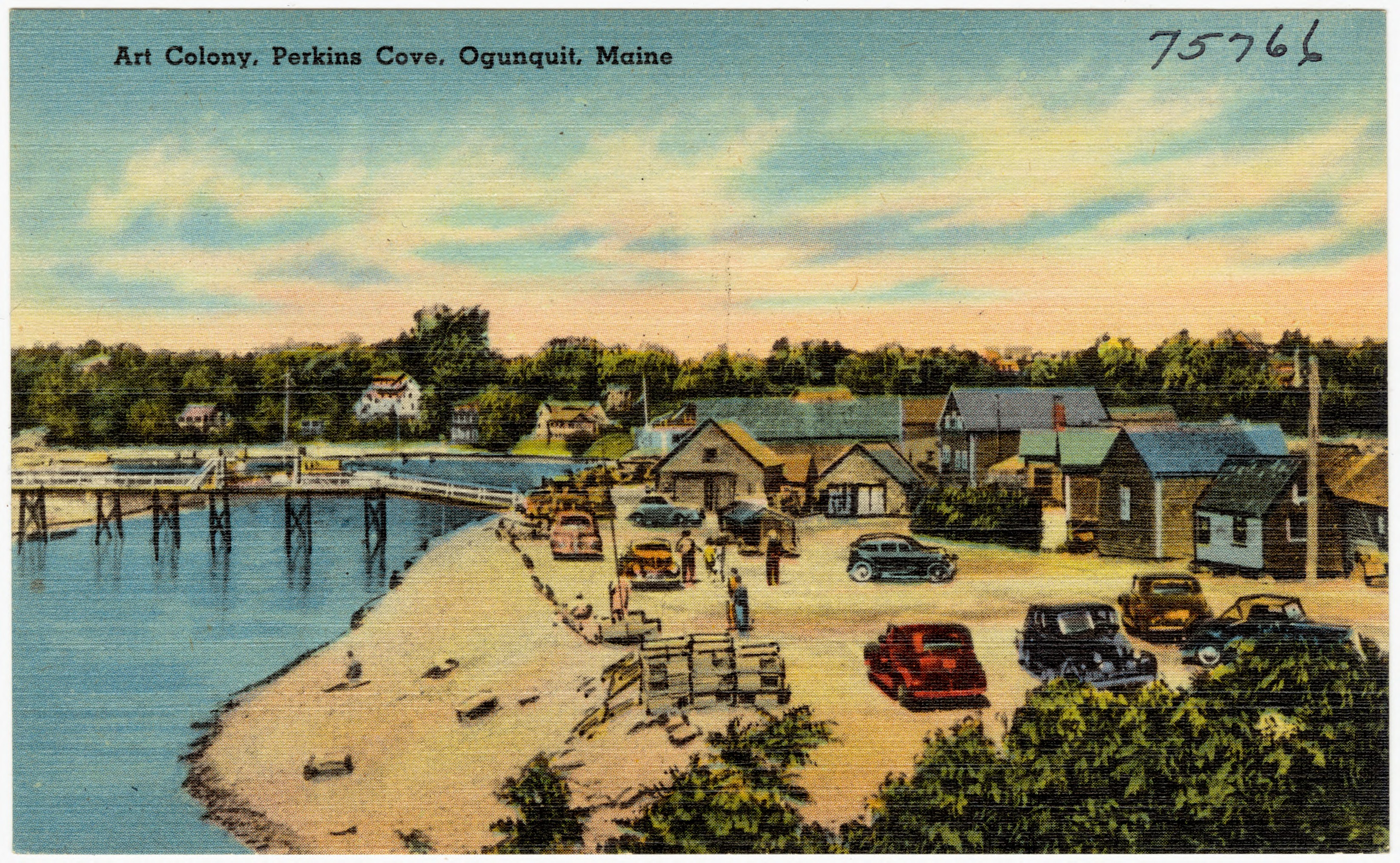
Ogunquit was the largest art colony in Maine for the better part of the 20th century. Initially drawn to the landscape, artists later came to study modernism with Robert Laurent and Hamilton Easter Field or regional impressionism with Charles Herbert Woodbury.

Art colonies are organic congregations of artists in towns, villages and rural areas, who are often drawn to areas of natural beauty, the prior existence of other artists, art schools there, or a lower cost of living. They are typically mission-driven planned communities, which administer a formal process for awarding artist residencies. A typical mission might include providing artists with the time, space, and support to create, fostering community among artists, and providing arts education, including lectures and workshops.

Early 20th century American guest-host models include MacDowell in Peterborough, New Hampshire and Yaddo in Saratoga Springs, New York. Two primary organizations serving artist colonies and residential centres are Res Artis in Amsterdam, and the Alliance of Artists Communities, in Providence, Rhode Island. Taiwan's Intra Asia Network is a less formal body working to advance creative communities and exchanges throughout Asia. Collectively, these groups oversee most of the world's active artists' colonies.

== Formative period in Europe ==
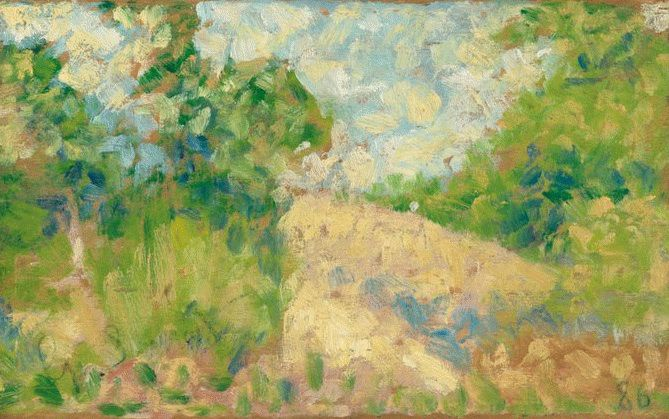
Champs à Barbizon (Field in Barbizon), an 1882 portrait by Georges Seurat of the countryside in France

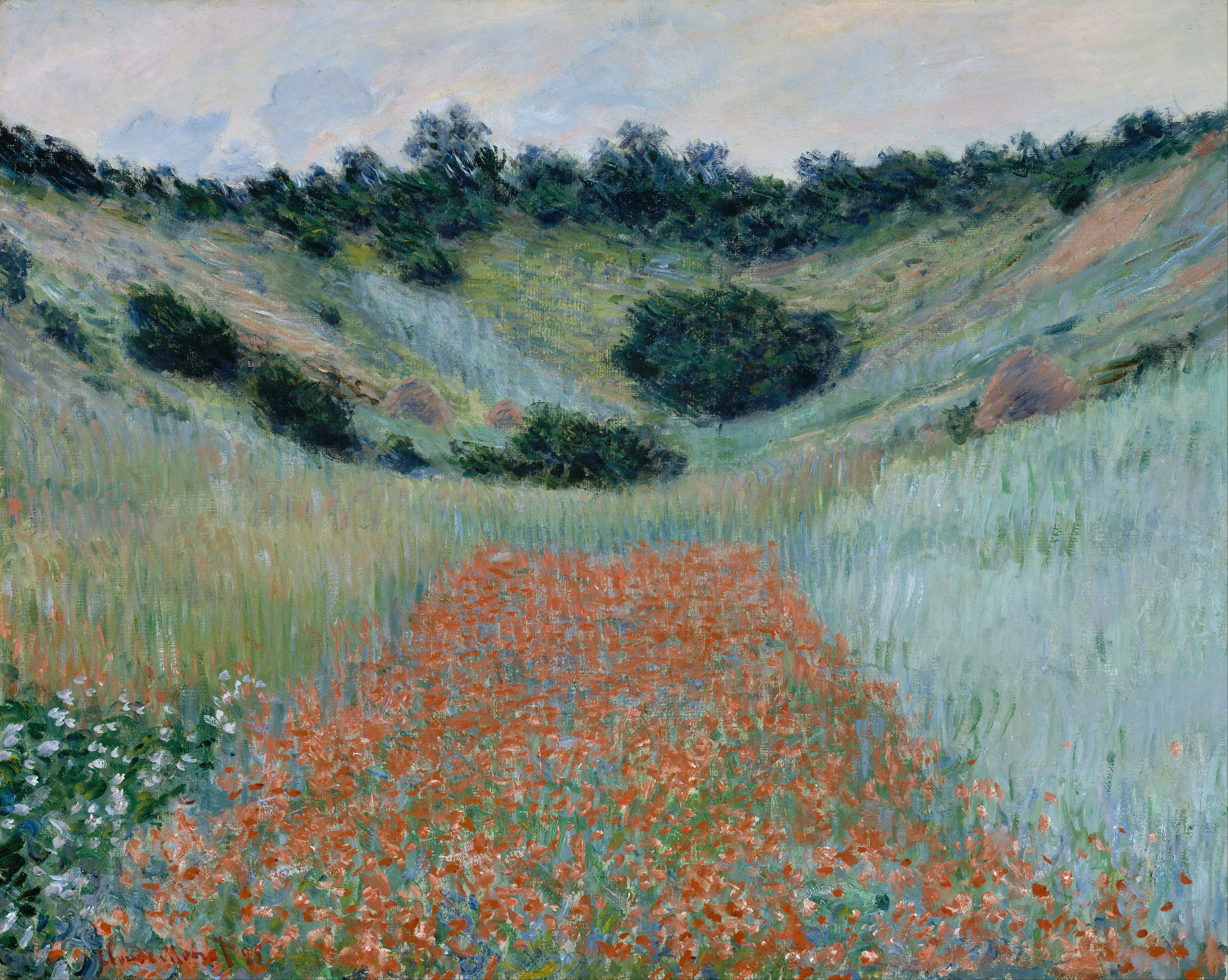
Claude Monet depicts the French countryside in Poppy Field in a Hollow near Giverny, an 1885 oil on canvas portrait

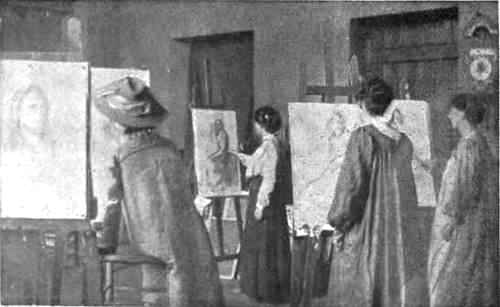
An art colony of students at the Newlyn Art School in England in 1910

Some painters were renowned within artistic circles for settling down permanently in a single village, most notably Jean-François Millet at Barbizon, Robert Wylie at Pont-Aven, Otto Modersohn at Worpswede, Heinrich Otto at Willinghausen, and Claude Monet at Giverny. They were not necessarily leaders, although these artists were respected and held a certain moral authority in their respective colonies. There were also regular 'colony hoppers' who moved about the art colonies of Europe in a nomadic fashion. Max Liebermann, for instance, painted at Barbizon, Dachau, Etzenhausen and at least six short-lived Dutch colonies; Frederick Judd Waugh worked in Barbizon, Concarneau, Grèz-sur-Loing, St Ives and Provincetown in the United States; Evert Pieters was active at Barbizon, Egmond, Katwijk, Laren, Blaricum, Volendam, and Oosterbeek; Elizabeth Armstrong Forbes painted at Pont-Aven, Zandvoort, Newlyn and St Ives.

Art colonies initially emerged as village movements in the 19th and early 20th century. It is estimated that between 1830 and 1914, some 3,000 professional artists participated in a mass movement away from urban centres into the countryside, residing for varying lengths of time in over 80 communities. These colonies are typically characterized according to year-round permanence and population size. Thus, transient colonies had annually fluctuating populations of artists, often painters who visited for just a single summer season, in places, such as Honfleur, Giverny, Katwijk, Frauenchiemsee, Volendam, and Willingshausen. Semi-stable colonies are characterized by their semi-permanent mix of visiting and resident artists who bought or built their own homes and studios. Examples would include Ahrenshoop, Barbizon, Concarneau, Dachau, St. Ives, Laren, and Skagen. Finally, stable colonies are characterized by their large groups of permanent full-time resident artists who bought or built their own homes and studios, in places such as Egmond, Sint-Martens-Latem, Newlyn, and Worpswede.

While artist colonies appeared across Europe, as well as in America and Australia, the majority of colonies were clustered in the Netherlands, Central Germany, and France (encircling Paris). Overall, artists of thirty-five different nationalities were represented throughout these colonies, with Americans, Germans and British forming the largest participating groups. This gave socialising a cosmopolitan flavour: "Russia, Sweden, England, Austria, Germany, France, Australia and the United States were represented at our table, all as one large family, and striving towards the same goal," the painter Annie Goater penned in 1885 in an essay on her recent experiences at one French colony.

Villages can also be classified according to the nationalities they attracted. Barbizon, Pont-Aven, Giverny, Katwijk, Newlyn, and Dachau drew artists from around the world and had a pronounced international flavour. Americans were always a major presence at Rijsoord, Egmond, Grèz-sur-Loing, Laren, and St Ives; Grèz-sur-Loing went through a Scandinavian phase in the 1880s; and Germans were the largest group after the indigenous Dutch at Katwijk. On the other hand, foreigners were rare at Sint-Martens-Latem, Tervuren, Nagybanya, Kronberg, Staithes, Worpswede, and Willingshausen, while Skagen hosted mainly Danes and a few other Scandinavians.

The greater number of early European art colonies were to be casualties of the First World War. Europe was no longer the same place socially, politically, economically and culturally, and art colonies seemed a quaint anachronism in an abrasively modernist world. However, a small proportion did endure in one or another form, and owe their continuing existence to cultural tourism. The colonies of Ahrenshoop, Barbizon, Fischerhude, Katwijk, Laren, Sint-Martens-Latem, Skagen, Volendam, Willingshausen, and Worpswede not only still operate in a modest fashion, but run their own museums where, besides maintaining historic collections of work produced at the colony, they organise exhibition and lecture programs. If they have not fared as well, several former major colonies such as Concarneau and Newlyn are remembered via small yet significant collections of pictures held in regional museums. Other colonies succumbed during the late twentieth century to cultural entrepreneurs who have redeveloped villages in the effort to simulate, within certain kitsch parameters, the 'authentic' appearance of the colony during its artistic heyday. This is not always successful, with Giverny, Grèz-sur-Loing, Kronberg, Le Pouldu, Pont-Aven, Schwaan, and Tervuren probably being among the most insensitively commercialised of the former art colonies.

== Art commune ==
An art commune is a communal living situation colony where collective art is produced as a function of the group's activities. Contemporary art communes are scattered around the world, yet frequently aloof to widespread attention due to displeasure or discomfort with mainstream society. In the 1960s and 1970s art communes such as Friedrichshof (also known as Aktionsanalytische Organisation) flourished. Creative art was enthusiastically produced within such groups, which became gathering points for the counterculture movement.

From a sociological viewpoint the art producing communes of the 1970s failed to sustain themselves, owing largely to the fact that they tended to have open memberships, which eventually attracted people with social problems. These problems then spread and become too difficult for these autonomous entities to handle, although some groups, such as the former Kunsthaus Tacheles, continued to flourish.

Today's art communes are a mix of artists, drifters, collectivists, activists, dadaists, and hangers on. Such groups are more politically and ideologically diverse than their mid-20th century counterparts, which has led to many art communes becoming more mainstream commercial entities.

== United States ==
=== Early model ===
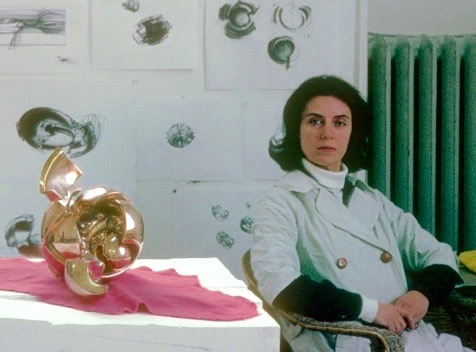
Artist Luise Kaish (1925-2013) at the American Academy in Rome

Some art colonies are organized and planned, while others arise because some artists like to congregate, finding fellowship and inspiration—and constructive competition—in the company of other artists.

The American Academy in Rome, founded in 1894 originally as the American School of Architecture, which in the following year joined with the American School of Classical Studies, is often cited as the early model for what would become the modern arts and humanities colony. Its well-funded, well-organized campus, and extensive program of fellowships, were soon replicated by early 20th-century artist colonies and their wealthy benefactors.

=== Northeast United States ===
==== New Hampshire ====
The MacDowell Colony in Peterborough was founded in 1907 by composer Edward MacDowell and his wife, Marian. MacDowell was inspired by the American Academy in Rome, and its mission to provide American artists with a home base at the centre of classical traditions and primary sources. MacDowell, who was a trustee of the American Academy, believed that a rural setting, free from distractions, would prove to be creatively valuable to artists. He also believed that discussions among working artists, architects and composers would enrich their work.

North Conway was an early Art Colony promoted by Benjamin Champney (1817-1907). In the early 1800s over four hundred artist traveled to the White Mountains painting the Romantic American Landscape in response to the Industrial Revolution. Painting the America they desired, not the America they were experiencing in the cities along the Eastern Seaboard.

==== New York ====
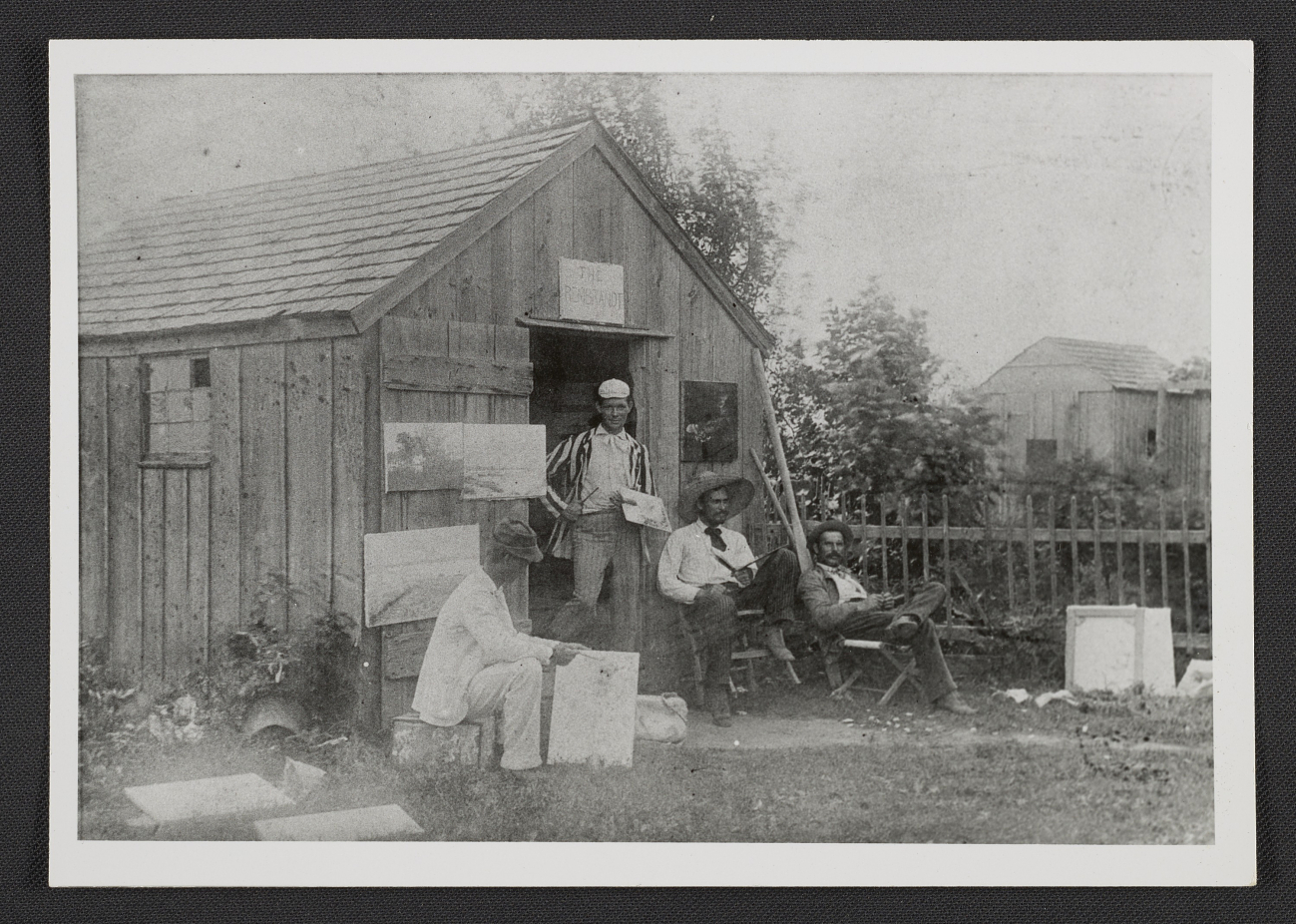
Students at the Shinnecock Hills Summer School of Art in Southampton, New York, c. 1895

Thomas and Wilhelmina Weber Furlong of the Art Students League of New York named their private summer residence the Golden Heart Farm art colony when they opened it in the summer of 1921. Located in upstate New York on Lake George, the colony and its artists in residence were at the center of the American modernist movement as important artists from Manhattan traveled to Golden Heart Farm to escape the city and study with the couple.

Another famous colony, Yaddo in Saratoga Springs was founded soon after. Spencer Trask and his wife Katrina Trask conceived the idea of Yaddo in 1900, but the first residency program for artists did not formally initiate until 1926.

The Woodstock Art Colony in the town of the same name began as two colonies. Originally known as Byrdcliffe, it was founded in 1902 by Ralph Radcliffe Whitehead, Hervey White, and Bolton Brown. Two years later, Hervey White renamed it the Maverick Colony, after seceding from Byrdcliffe in 1904. The town of Woodstock remains an active center of art galleries, music, and theatrical performances.

The Roycroft community was an influential Arts and Crafts art colony that included both artisans and artists. Founded by Elbert Hubbard in 1895, in the village of East Aurora, New York, near Buffalo its artisans were influential on the development of early 20th-century American furniture, books, lamps and metalwork. The colony drew from the Saturday Sketch Club for many of its artists, as the club was located near a cabin used by Buffalo art students who specialized in outdoor oil painting.

In 1973, Edna St. Vincent Millay's sister Norma created the Millay Colony for the Arts at the historic site of Steepletop in Austerlitz.

By the early 1970s, East Hampton had developed a reputation as a vibrant artists' colony. A growing community of artists, writers, and performers established seasonal residences and shared spaces. The Hamptons continues to attract artists and creative professionals.

Cherry Grove has long attracted artists, but a formal artist residency was founded in the 21st century as the Fire Island Artists Residency (FIAR).

==== Massachusetts ====
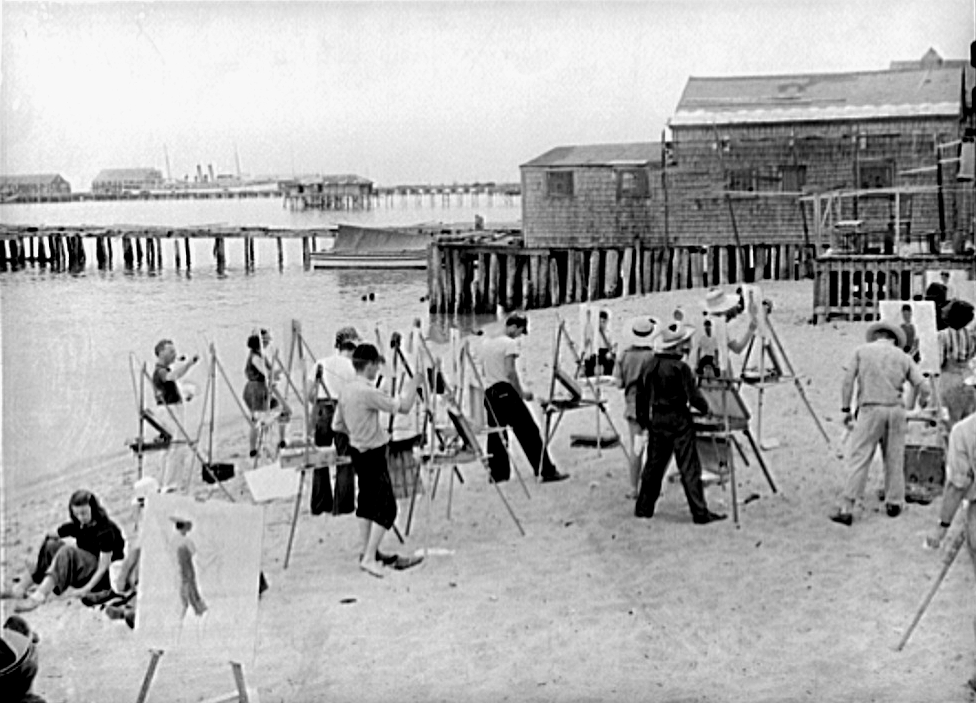
A 1940 photograph of an outdoor art class in Provincetown, Massachusetts, an art center that provided ample income for several art schools.

The Provincetown art colony came into being when Charles Webster Hawthorne opened his Cape Cod School of Art there in the summer of 1899. The art school attracted other artists, and expanded the colony, which led to the foundation of the Provincetown Art Association. By 1916, a Boston Globe headline reported the "Biggest Art Colony in the World at Provincetown." Provincetown claims to be the oldest continuously operating artist's colony in the United States.

==== Rhode Island ====
The Fort Thunder art commune was located in a warehouse on the second floor of a pre-Civil War former textile factory in the Olneyville district of Providence, Rhode Island. Started by artists and musicians Mat Brinkman and Brian Chippendale in 1995 and would be demolished to create a parking lot for a Shaw's grocery store and a Staples in 2002.

=== Southern United States ===
==== Florida ====
In Delray Beach, Florida, a seasonal Artists and Writers Colony existed during the winter months from the mid-1920s until the early 1950s. The Delray Beach enclave was noted for attracting many famous cartoonists of the era.

==== Maryland ====
In Nottingham, the Mid-Atlantic Plein Aire Company, most notable for the involvement of artist William David Simmons, remains active. Now known as the Mid-Atlantic Plein Air Painters Association (MAPAPA), its mission remains the same: to educate and expose local artists and the general public with classical painting traditions.

=== Midwestern United States ===
==== Michigan ====
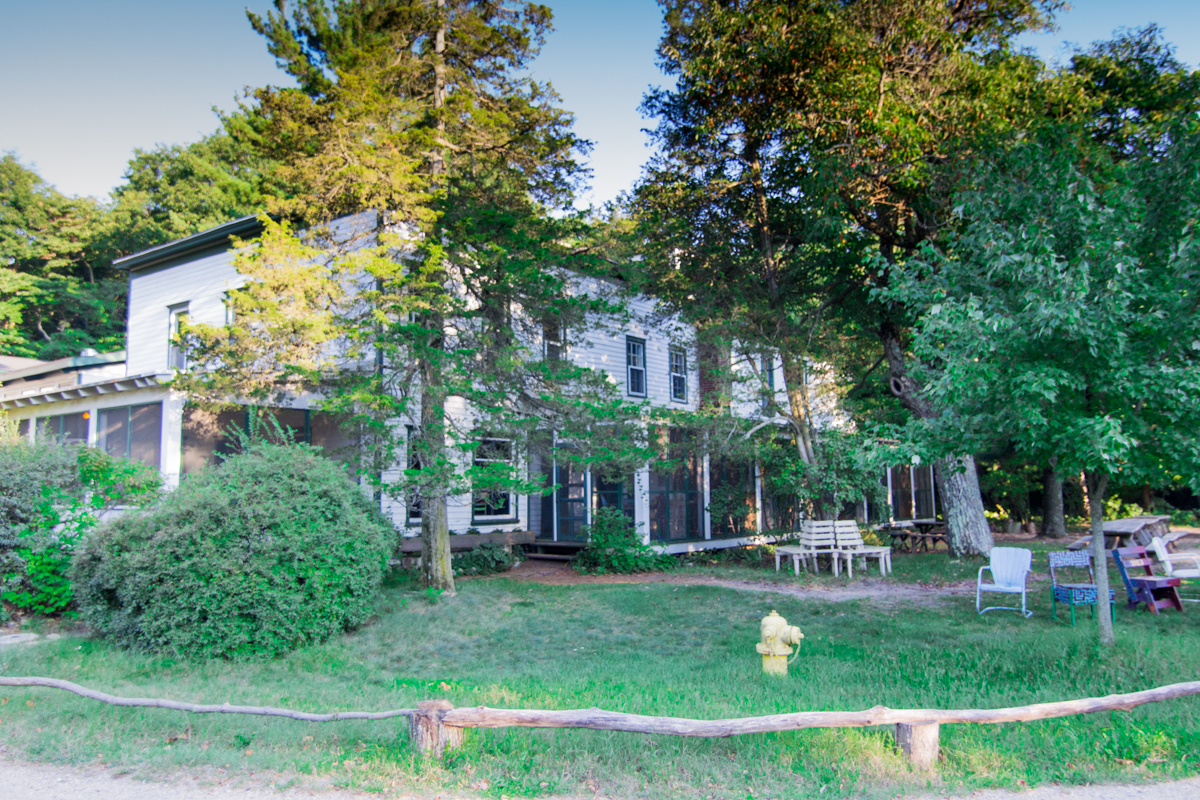
The Ox-Bow School of Art and Artists' Residency in Saugatuck, Michigan

The Ox-Bow School of Art and Artists' Residency was founded in Saugatuck in 1910 by Frederick Fursman and Walter Marshall Clute, both faculty from the School of the Art Institute of Chicago (SAIC). Fursman and Clute's vision was to create a respite where faculty and students could immerse themselves completely in artmaking, surrounded by a supportive community of artists and an inspired landscape of natural dunes, woods and water.

=== Western United States ===
==== Arizona ====
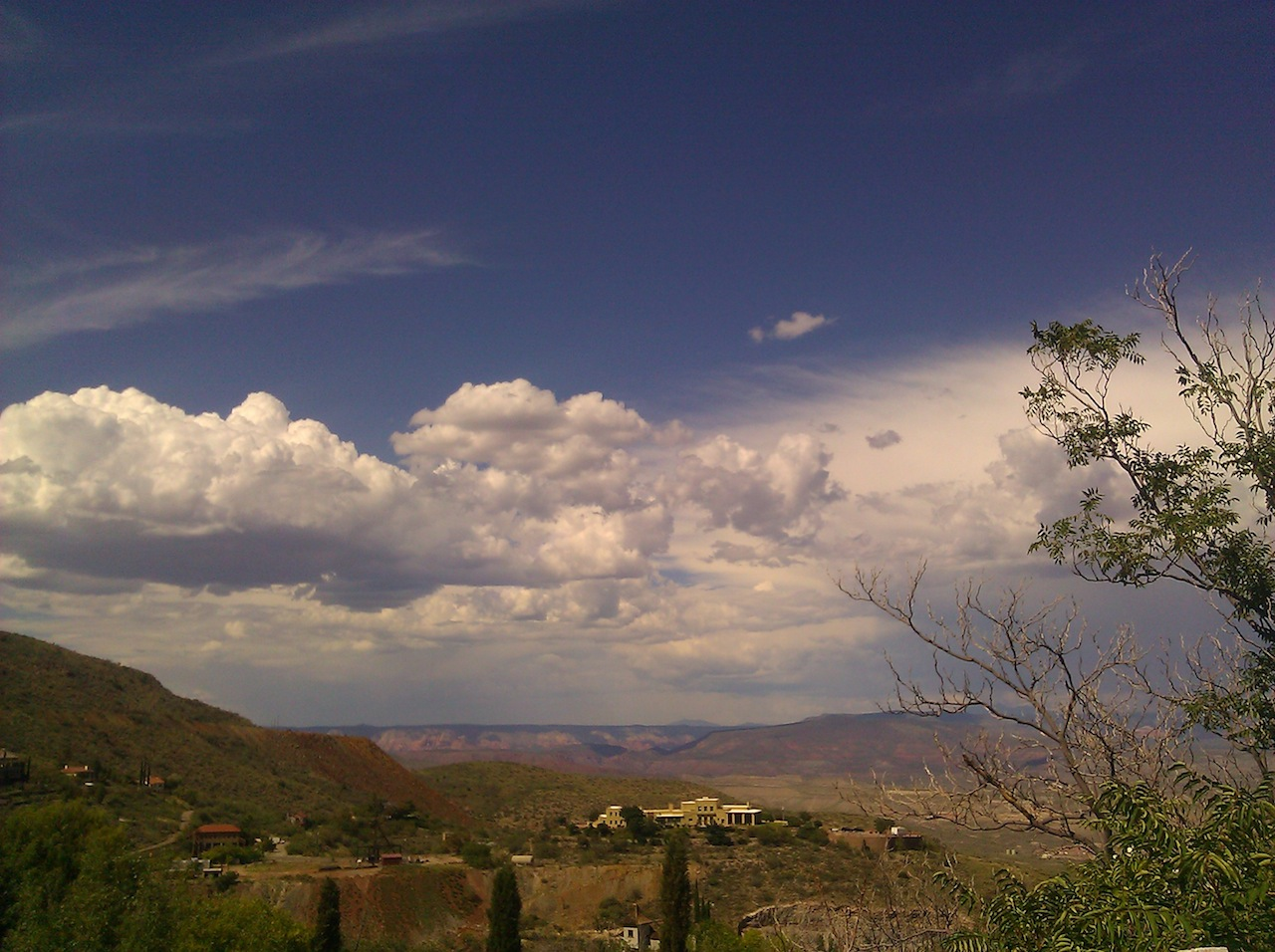
Historic Jerome, Arizona, a copper-mining town that later attracted artists

The desert town of Sedona, Arizona, became a Southwest artists' colony in the mid-20th century. Dadaist Max Ernst and Surrealist Dorothea Tanning arrived from New York in the late 1940s, when the town was populated by less than 500 ranchers, orchard workers, merchants, and small Native American communities. Amid the Wild West setting, Ernst built a small cottage by hand in Brewer Road, and he and Tanning hosted intellectuals and European artists such as Henri Cartier-Bresson and Yves Tanguy. Sedona proved an inspiration for the artists, and for Ernst—who compiled his book Beyond Painting and completed his sculptural masterpiece Capricorn while living there. The environment also inspired Egyptian sculptor Nassan Gobran to move there from Boston and become head of the art department at Verde Valley School.

In Southern Arizona in the early and mid-twentieth century, the Historic Fort Lowell enclave outside of Tucson, Arizona, became an artistic epicenter. The adobe ruins of the abandoned nineteenth century United States Cavalry fort had been adapted by Mexican-Americans into a small village called "El Fuerte." During the 1920s, 30s and 40s, artists, writers and intellectuals, attracted by the rural elegance and stark landscape of the Sonoran Desert, and romanticism of the adobe ruins began buying, redesigning and building homes in this small community. Notable artists included Dutch-born artist Charles Bolsius, Black Mountain College instructor and photographer Hazel Larson Archer, architectural designer and painter Veronica Hughart, early modernist Jack Maul, French writers and artists René Cheruy and Germaine Cheruy, and noted anthropologists Edward H. Spicer and Rosamond Spicer

The small historic town of Jerome, Arizona was once a thriving copper mining town of 15,000. When the mining company Phelps Dodge closed the United Verde Mine and its related operations in 1953, the number of residents plummeted to 100. To prevent Jerome from disappearing entirely, the remaining residents turned to tourism and retail. To further encourage tourism, the residents sought National Historic Landmark status, which the federal government granted in 1967. Today, by sponsoring music festivals, historic-homes tours, celebrations, and races, the community succeeded in attracting visitors and new businesses, which in the twenty-first century include art galleries, working public studios, craft stores, wineries, coffee houses, and restaurants. Many residents are full-time artists, writers, and musicians.

==== California ====
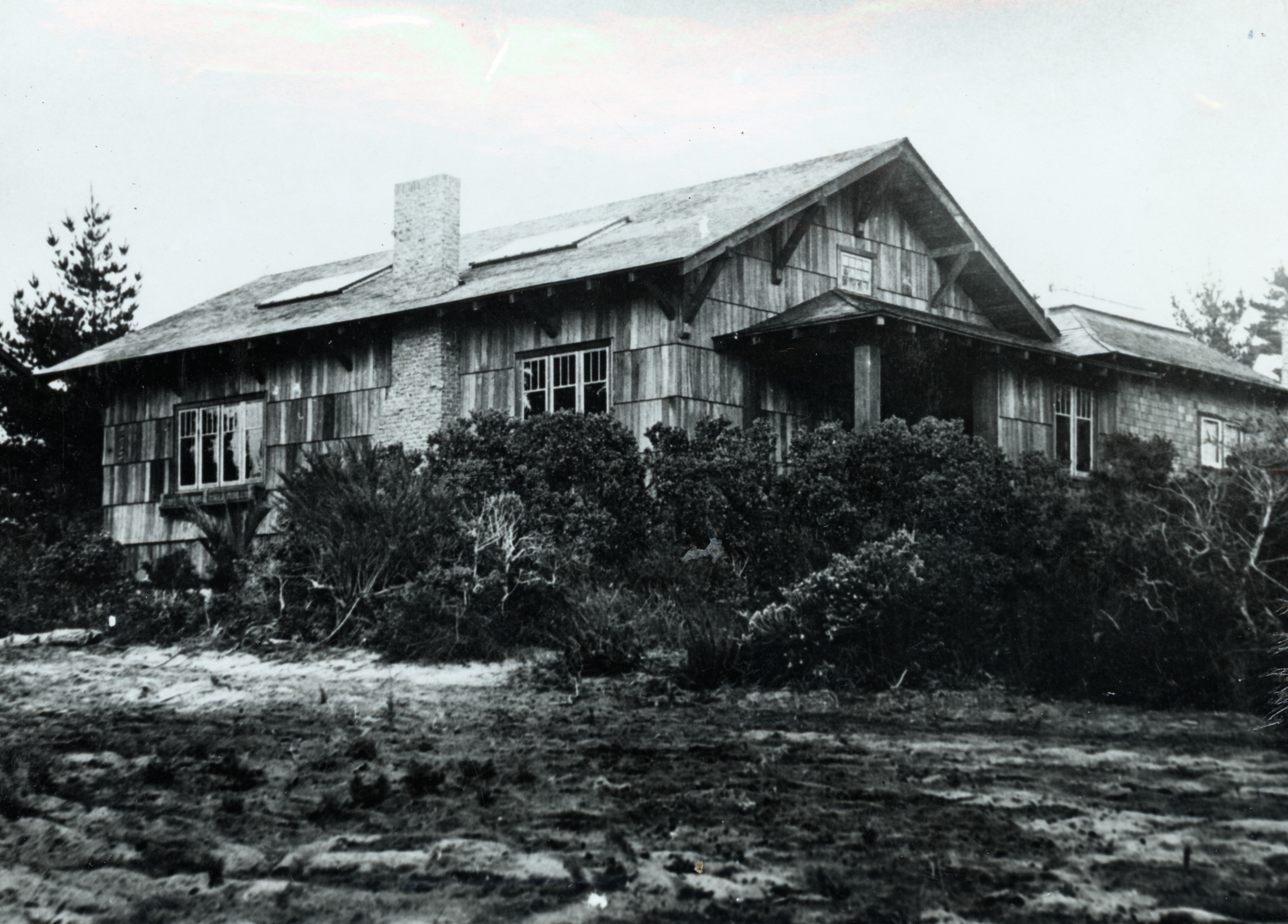
Carmel Arts and Crafts Club Hall in 1907 California.

James Franklin Devendorf was one of the founders of the Carmel Arts and Crafts Club to support artistic works. The artists at Carmel-by-the-Sea, California coalesced in 1905 and incorporated their art gallery and meeting rooms a year later as the Carmel Arts and Crafts Club. They staged annual and special exhibitions, which attracted distinguished visiting artists from across the country, and provided professional instruction in painting, sculpture, and crafts. At the urging of his former student Jennie V. Cannon, William Merritt Chase was persuaded to teach his last summer school here in 1914. Between 1919 and ca.1948 it was the largest art colony on the Pacific Coast of the United States. In 1927, the Carmel Art Association replaced the Arts and Crafts Club and thrives today as the nexus for the art community on the Peninsula of Monterey, California and Big Sur. The Carmel Art Institute was established in 1938, and included among its instructors Armin Hansen and Paul Dougherty. John Cunningham began at the Institute when he helped teach a painting class for Hansen when he fell ill. In 1940, Hansen and the Whitman transferred ownership of the institute to Cunningham and his wife.

==== New Mexico ====
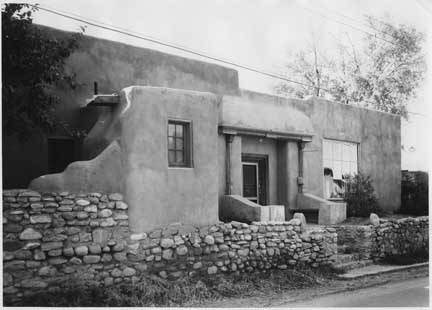
The home of Gerald Cassidy, a founding member of the Sante Fe art colony in Santa Fe, New Mexico in the early 20th century, c. 1937

The Taos art colony in Taos, New Mexico is an example of more organic development. The semi-desert landscape, clear skies and stunning light, and the cultural richness of both Hispanic and Pueblo Indian cultures in and around Taos attracted many artists throughout the 20th century. Joseph Henry Sharp visited Taos on an 1883 sketching trip and later shared his enthusiasm for the area while studying in Paris with artists Bert G. Phillips and Ernest L. Blumenschein. As a result of a broken wagon wheel while en route to Mexico on September 3, 1898, the two artists stayed in the Taos area instead. Back in Paris, Blumenschein met Eangar I. Couse and told him of Taos. Oscar E. Berninghaus and Herbert Dunton joined the Taos artists, comprising the "Founding" group of six. On July 1, 1915, the Taos Society of Artists held its first meeting. In 1916 Mabel Dodge, the New York socialite, and her husband, artist Maurice Sterne, moved to Taos, where Mabel started Taos' literary colony and recruited many artists to relocate there. Georgia O’Keeffe first visited Taos in 1929, visited the area every summer, and moved permanently to Abiquiu, New Mexico in 1946. Other famous artists who frequented Taos are Ansel Adams and D.H. Lawrence.Once artists began settling and working in Taos, others came, art galleries and museums were opened and the area became an artistic center—though not a formal, funded art colony providing artists with aid, as Yaddo and MacDowell do.

== North America ==
=== Canada ===
- Emma Lake Artists' Workshops, Emma Lake, Saskatchewan, Canada
- Lake Edith Artist Collective, Jasper, Alberta, Canada

=== Mexico ===
- San Miguel de Allende, Guanajuato, Mexico

=== United States ===
==== Northeastern United States ====
- Arden, Delaware
- Brattleboro, Vermont
- Byrdcliffe Colony, Woodstock, New York
- Brandywine School, Chadds Ford, Pennsylvania
- Cornish Art Colony, Cornish, New Hampshire
- Cos Cob, Connecticut
- East Aurora, New York, Roycroft campus
- Gloucester, Massachusetts
- Greenwich Village, New York City
- Hudson, New York
- Isles of Shoals, Maine/New Hampshire
- MacDowell Colony, Peterborough, New Hampshire
- Millay Colony, Austerlitz, New York
- Monhegan, Maine
- Montclair, New Jersey
- New Hope, Pennsylvania
- New Rochelle artist colony, New Rochelle, New York
- Nook Farm, Connecticut
- North Conway, New Hampshire
- Nyack, New York
- Oakdale, New York
- Old Lyme Art Colony, Old Lyme, Connecticut
- Ogunquit, Maine
- Palenville, New York
- Provincetown, Massachusetts
  - Fine Arts Work Center, Provincetown, Massachusetts
- Rockport, Massachusetts
- Shinnecock Hills Summer School of Art, New York
- Silvermine, Connecticut
- Skowhegan, Maine
- South Mountain Road, New City, New York
- The Wassaic Project, Wassaic, New York
- Williamsburg, Brooklyn, New York City
- Woodstock, New York
- Yaddo, Saratoga Springs, New York

==== Southern United States ====
- Bug Tussle, Alabama
- Delray Beach, Florida
- St. Augustine, Florida
- The Studios of Key West, Florida
- Village of the Arts, Bradenton, Florida
- Virginia Center for the Creative Arts, Amherst, Virginia

==== Midwestern United States ====
- Brown County Art Colony, Brown County, Indiana
- Carl Street Studios, Old Town, Chicago
- Eagle's Nest Art Colony, Illinois
- Galena, Illinois
- Grand Marais, Minnesota
- Norman, Oklahoma
- Ragdale, Lake Forest, Illinois
- Richmond Group, Richmond, Indiana
- Stone City Art Colony, Stone City, Iowa
- Tree Studio Building and Annexes, Chicago, Illinois

==== Western United States ====
- Beaux Arts Village, Washington
- Berkeley, California
- Bolinas, California
- Carmel-by-the-Sea, California
- Headlands Center for the Arts, Fort Barry, California
- Bisbee, Arizona
- Jerome, Arizona
- Laguna Beach, California
- Madrid, New Mexico
- Marfa, Texas
- Monterey, California
- Nespelem, Washington
- Oakland, California
- Pacific Grove, California
- Pond Farm, Guerneville, California
- Santa Fe art colony, Santa Fe, New Mexico
- Sausalito, California
- Taos, New Mexico
- Ucross Foundation, Wyoming

== Europe ==
=== Northern Europe ===
==== Denmark ====
- Bornholm school of painters
- Funen Painters
- Odsherred Painters
- Skagen, home of the Skagen Painters

==== Finland ====
- Önningeby (Åland)
- Tuusula

==== Norway ====
- Åsgårdstrand
- Balestrand
- Vågåsommeren

==== United Kingdom ====
- Chipping Campden, Gloucestershire
- Cockburnspath (Lammermuir) (Guthrie, Cawhall, Melville)
- Ditchling, Sussex
- Glasgow School, Glasgow
- Holland Park Circle, Holland Park, West London (George Frederic Watts, Frederic Leighton, Val Prinsep, Luke Fildes, William Burges, Hamo Thornycroft, Marcus Stone, and William Holman Hunt
- Kirkcudbright (Dumfries) (Glasgow School)
- Newlyn, Cornwall (Stanhope Forbes, Munnings, Laura Knight, Gotch, Tayler, Tuke)
- St. Ives, Cornwall (Hepworth)
- Staithes, North Yorkshire (Laura Knight, Anderson, Bagshawe, Barrett, Booth)
- Walberswick (Suffolk) (Steer, Keens)

=== Southern Europe ===
==== Cyprus ====
- Lempa

==== Greece ====
- Argalasti, South Pelion

==== Spain ====
- Sitges

=== Western Europe ===
==== Belgium ====
- Ateliers Mommen, Brussels
- Sint-Martens-Latem
- Tervuren

==== France ====
- Abbaye de Créteil
- Argenteuil (Monet, Sysley then Signac)
- Auvers-sur-Oise (Van Gogh, Gauguin)
- Barbizon (Rousseau, Millet)
- Bougival
- Céret (Soutine, Krémègne, Masson, Marquet)
- Crozant
- Étaples (Henri Le Sidaner, then English-language Impressionists and Post-Impressionists between 1890 and 1914)
- Giverny (Monet)
- Grez-sur-Loing (Corot, Larsson)[1]
- L'Isle-Adam
- Pont-Aven and Le-Pouldu (Gauguin, Sérusier)
- Puteaux

==== Germany ====
- Ahrenshoop
- Benz
- Dachau art colony
- Hiddensee
- Kronberg
- Kallmünz
- Worpswede
- Schwaan

==== Netherlands ====
- Bergen, North Holland
- Domburg
- Katwijk
- Laren
- Kortenhoef
- Scheveningen
- Noorden
- Oosterbeek
- Rijsoord

=== Eastern Europe ===
==== Hungary ====
- Epreskert Art Colony, Budapest
- Gödöllő
- Hódmezővásárhely
- Kecskemét
- Nagybánya (today Baia Mare, Romania)
- Százados Road Art Colony, Budapest
- Szentendre
- Szolnok

==== Lithuania ====
- Nida (also known as Nidden)

==== North Macedonia ====
- Ohrid Colony Ramazzoti
- Strumitsa
- Veles

==== Poland ====
- Kazimierz Dolny
- Zakopane

==== Russia ====
- Abramtsevo
- Peredelkino
- Talashkino

==== Serbia ====
- Savamala, Belgrade
- Gamzigrad

==== Ukraine ====
- Kremenets

== Middle East ==
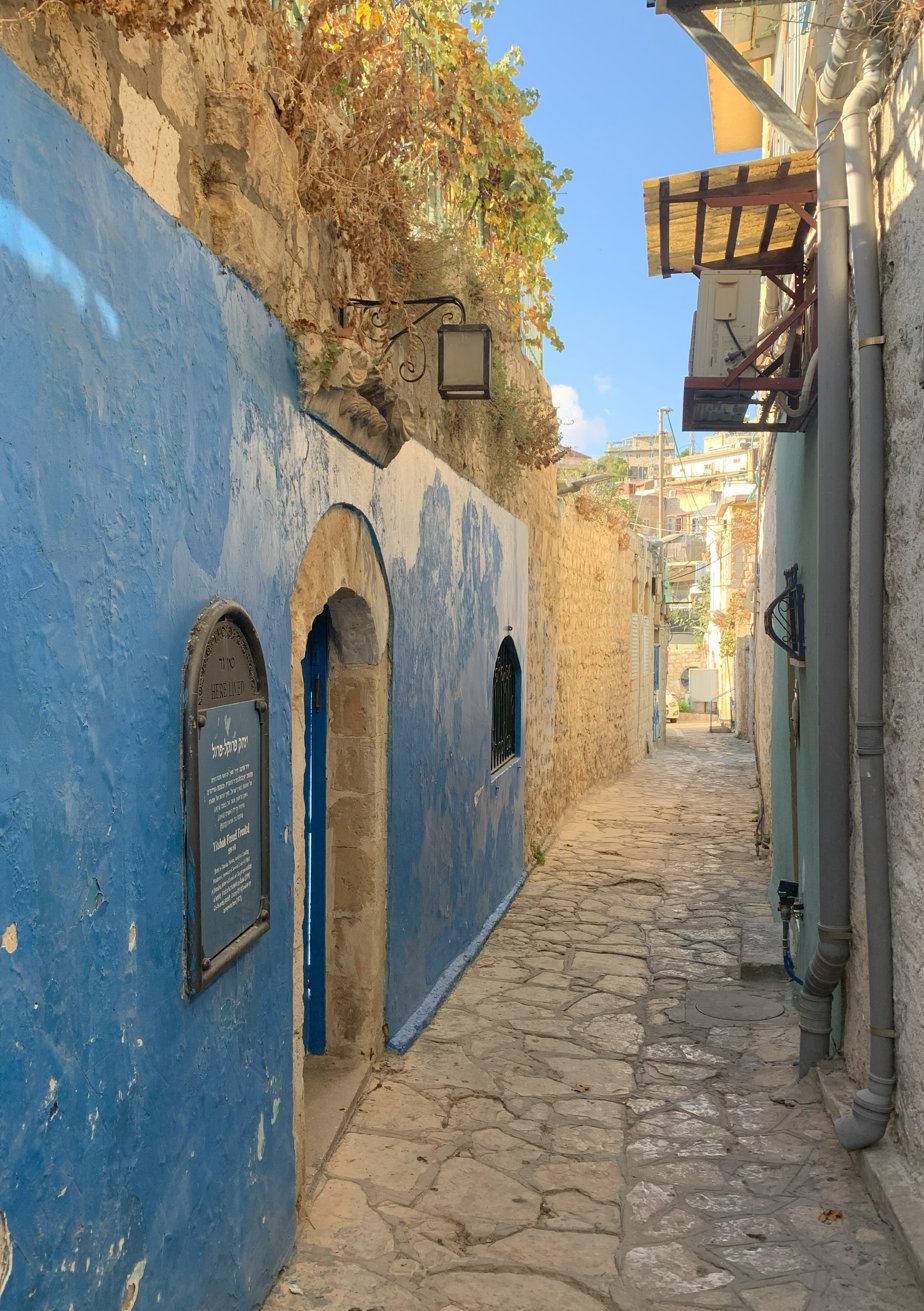
An alley in the Artists' quarter of Safed

=== Israel ===
- Artists Colony of Safed
- Aniaam
- Ein Hod
- Tsukim

== South America ==
=== Brazil ===
- Instituto Sacatar, Salvador, Brazil

=== Uruguay ===
- Fundación Pablo Atchugarry, San Carlos Municipality, Maldonado

== Australasia ==
- Artists' camps, around Sydney harbour, Australia (1880s to 1890s)
- Montsalvat, Melbourne, Australia (1930s to present)
- Wainoni Park, Christchurch, New Zealand (1880s to 1910)

== Africa ==
=== Zimbabwe ===
- Tengenenge

== See also ==
- Social centre
- The Studio (commune)
- Wulf Zendik
- ZBS Foundation
