= Epreskert Art Colony =

Coordinates: 47.513°N 19.072°E

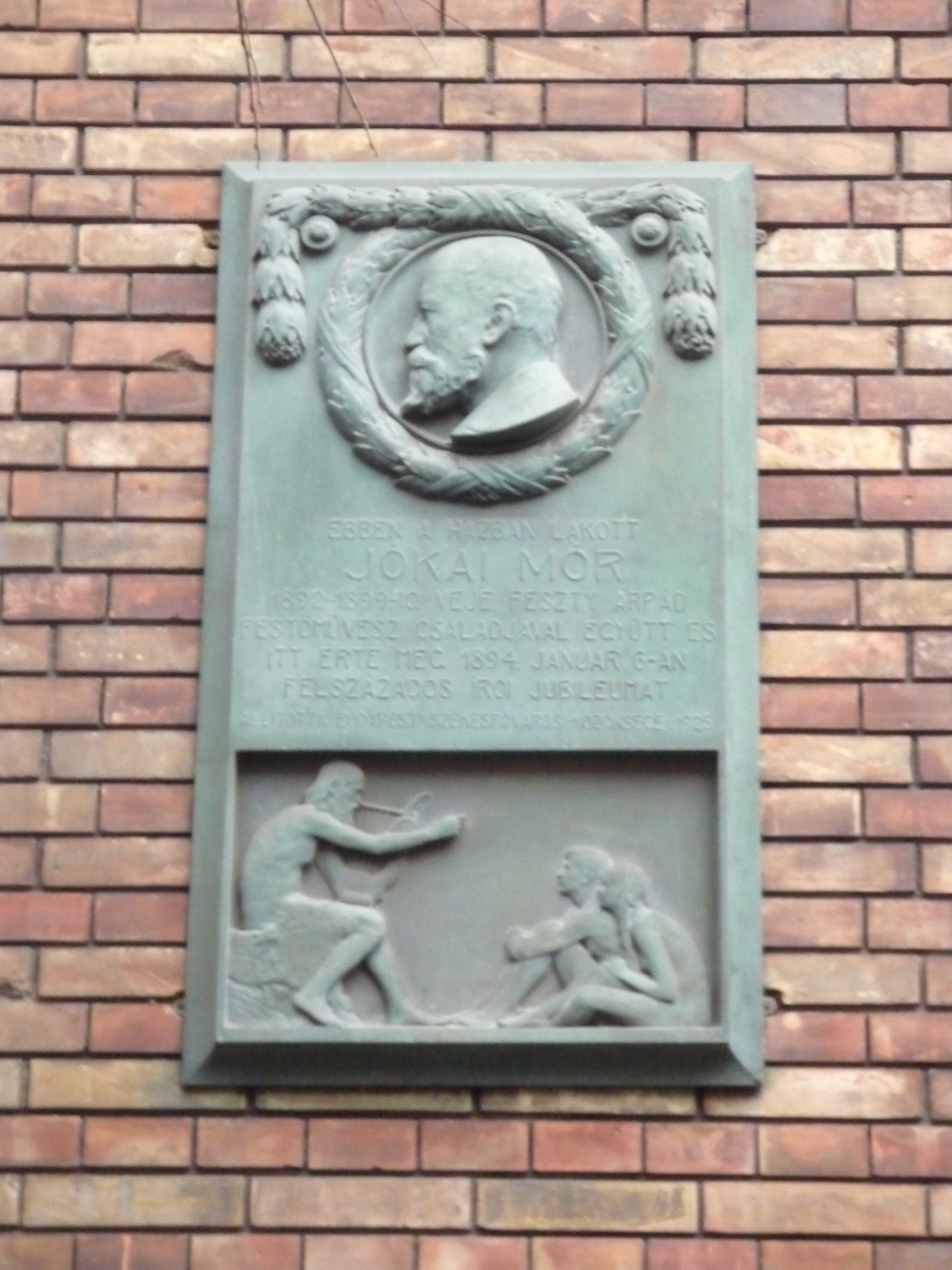
Historical marker on the Feszty-Jókai Palace

Epreskert Art Colony (Hungarian: Epreskerti művésztelep; the name means "Mulberry Garden" in Hungarian) was an artists' colony in Budapest in the last decades of the 19th and the first half of the 20th century. Among the artists who worked and lived there the most important were sculptors György Zala and Adolf Huszár, and painter Árpád Feszty.

== Location ==
The artists' colony was located in the Terézváros district of Budapest (District VI.) in the area of the former Epreskert garden. The colony occupied an oblong shaped block bounded by Bajza, Lendvay, Epreskert (after 1900 Munkácsy Mihály) and Kmety Street. In 1886 the block was divided into ten lots for ateliers. The Hungarian Academy of Fine Arts (now Hungarian University of Fine Arts) established its campus on the other side of Kmety Street.

== History ==
The Epreskert was a municipal garden of mulberry trees on the outskirts of Pest which remained in agricultural usage until the 1870s. After the opening of Andrássy Avenue in 1871 the commercial value of the plot went up and urbanization began. In 1879 the municipal council donated a parcel on the corner of Bajza and Lendvay Streets to Adolf Huszár, a renowned sculptor who worked on prestigious municipal projects but was in need of a suitable workshop. Two years later Huszár built an atelier in fashionable Neo-Renaissance style and became the first artist to live there.

The garden was divided into two by the opening of a new street (called Kmety Street) in 1883. The Hungarian Academy of Fine Arts established its campus on the northern parcel. The southern city block was intended to become an artists' colony. Many famous artists applied for lots but the municipal council was slow to make decisions. The block was divided into nine plots (the tenth was Huszárs' property). In the first round only one plot was apportioned to painter Gyula Aggházy who built a house on the corner of Epreskert and Kmety Streets in 1884.

In 1886 three plots in Lendvay Street were leased by the municipality to sculptors György Zala, Gyula Donáth and Antal Szécsi. Kmety Street became the painter's row in 1890 when three plots were leased to Árpád Feszty, Ida Konek and Béla Pállik. Good political connections played a larger part in the decision than artistic merits.

Two neighbouring plots on 31-33 Kmety Street remained empty. The parcel was used by the municipality as storage place for cobble stones from 1897 until 1910 when it was sold for a private villa.

The colony flourished in the last decade of the 19th century. Rising property prices in the first decade of the 20th century caused a strong demand for plots suitable for building private villas. After the artists died or moved elsewhere the municipality sold their plots to developers. In 1914 there were only three ateliers in the former colony compared to five private villas, one cultural institution and one empty plot. The artists' colony practically ceased to exist but one atelier survived even after the second world war.

During the siege of Budapest the city block was seriously damaged. After the war many of ruined buildings were demolished and the plots on Lendvay Street (the former sculptor's row) were acquired by the Soviet authorities. Now this part of the block is used as an extension and garden of the Russian Embassy in Budapest.

== Ateliers ==
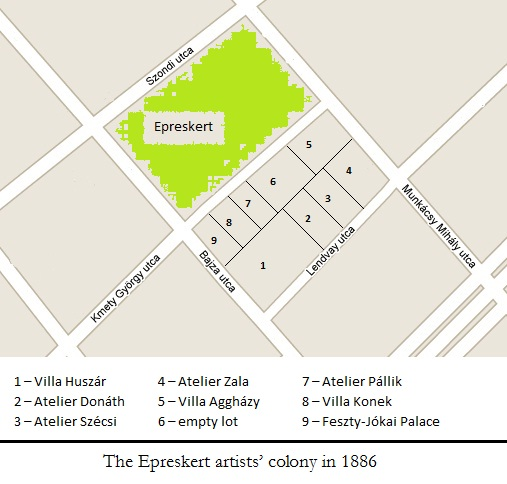

- Villa Huszár (2 Lendvay Street) — The parcel on the corner of Lendvay and Bajza Streets was sold by the municipality to sculptor Adolf Huszár in 1879. The house-cum-atelier was built in 1881 by the plans of Kálmán Gerster in fashionable Neo-Renaissance style. The garden was larger than the other plots in the colony. Huszár worked on his last work, the sculpture of Hungarian statesman Ferenc Deák in his studio until his early death in 1885. The heirs of his estate leased the atelier to other sculptors but later sold the house to a property developer in 1889. The garden was divided and the house was converted to a private villa. It was enlarged and thoroughly rebuilt in 1925–27 by the plans of Emil Vidor. At present the house belongs to the Russian Embassy in Budapest.
- Atelier Donáth (6 Lendvay Street) — Sculptor Gyula Donáth's atelier was a simple wooden shed erected on the property in 1887. Donáth lived there until his death in 1909 when the studio was dismantled. The plot was sold to a developer but remained unbuilt.
- Atelier Szécsi (8 Lendvay Street) — Sculptor Antal Szécsi's atelier was a simple timber-framed building (1886) which was later enlarged by the artist. Szécsi lived in the colony until his death in 1904. The studio was leased by the municipality to sculptor Ede Telcs who used it for work but never lived here. The studio was leased to architect and sculptor Géza Maróti in 1911. Maroti moved to the Lendvay Street home in the early 1920s. The council abrogated his contract in 1937 and building was leased to the Hungarian Association of High Frequency Radio Amateurs. It was destroyed during the siege of Budapest.
- Atelier Zala (10 Lendvay Street) — Sculptor György Zala bought a former exhibition pavilion and re-erected it as a studio on the corner of Lendvay and Epreskert Street in 1888. A brick addition contained the flat of the artist and a rented studio for painters. The house was sold to painter Zsigmond Vajda in 1898. Vajda sold the land to a developer in 1909 who demolished the studio.
- Villa Aggházy (35 Kmety Street) — Painter Gyula Aggházy built his gabled, one storey high villa on the corner of Epreskert and Kmety Street in 1884 by the plans of Béla Benczúr. The artist sold the house in 1909 to a developer who demolished it for a larger mansion.
- Atelier Kernstok (29 Kmety Street) — Animal artist Béla Pállik, who was mockingly called "sheep-painter", built his atelier in 1891 by plans of Vince Medek. Three studios on the second floor were rented to other painters. The house was inherited by his daughter, Margit Pállik in 1908. It was sold in 1916 to sculptor Gina Stricker who later married to avantgarde painter Károly Kernstok. They rebuilt the house in 1936 which remained Kernstok's studio until his death in 1940. The building housed ateliers during the second half of the 20th century. Later it was bought by contemporary architect György Vadász for the same use.
- Villa Konek (27 Kmety Street) — The small, turreted villa was built for painter Ida Konek in 1890 by Gyula Kauser. It was an elegant, secluded home for the artist and her older sister. Private exhibitions were held in 1903, 1915 and 1917. The house was destroyed during the siege of Budapest in 1945.

There were three other ateliers in the Epreskert academy campus nearby which belonged to painters Gyula Benczúr and Károly Lotz, and sculptor Alajos Stróbl. The studios were places of work and teaching but strictly speaking they were not part of the artists' colony.

== The Feszty-Jókai family ==
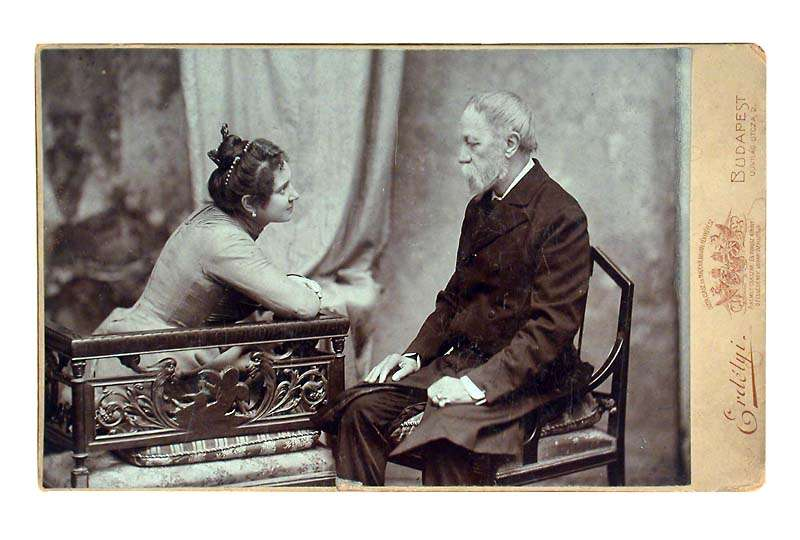
Jókai with his young wife, Bella Nagy.

The most important house in the Epreskert artists' colony was the small palace of the Feszty-Jókai family. Árpád Feszty, creator of the famous Feszty Cyclorama acquired the parcel on the corner of Bajza and Kmety Streets in 1890. He built a small palace in Venetian Gothic style according to his own plans. The façade was decorated with reliefs by Gyula Donáth and György Zala (both artists lived in the colony) together with the coat-of-arms of the Feszty and Jókai families. Feszty had a two storeys high studio.

The celebrated writer, Mór Jókai was stepfather of Feszty's wife, Róza Jókai. He was a widower who chose to live with the young couple. Jókai occupied the upper floor while the Fesztys lived downstairs. Róza Jókai's salon soon became the center of the artistic and social life of Budapest. Ministers, politicians, actors and actresses, curators, writers and painters gathered regularly in the small Venetian palace on Bajza Street. From the older generation Kálmán Tisza and Kálmán Mikszáth were regular visitors at Jókai upstairs. In 1894 Jókai celebrated his golden jubilee as an author in the palace.

The golden era of the palace ended with the biggest social scandal of the decade. In 1899 the 74-year-old Jókai suddenly married a young actress, Bella Nagy. The public and the Fesztys were equally shocked. Jókai left the palace and the family got mixed up in a public debate. In the next few years Feszty ran into a huge debt and was forced to sell the house in 1907.

The palace was bought by the Petőfi Literary Society, which converted it into a literary museum (forerunner of the current Petőfi Museum of Literature). It was damaged in World War II but was rebuilt in 1947. After the museum moved out the palace was converted into storage place for a natural history collection, and later an atelier for sculptor Pál Kő in the 1990s.

== Gallery ==
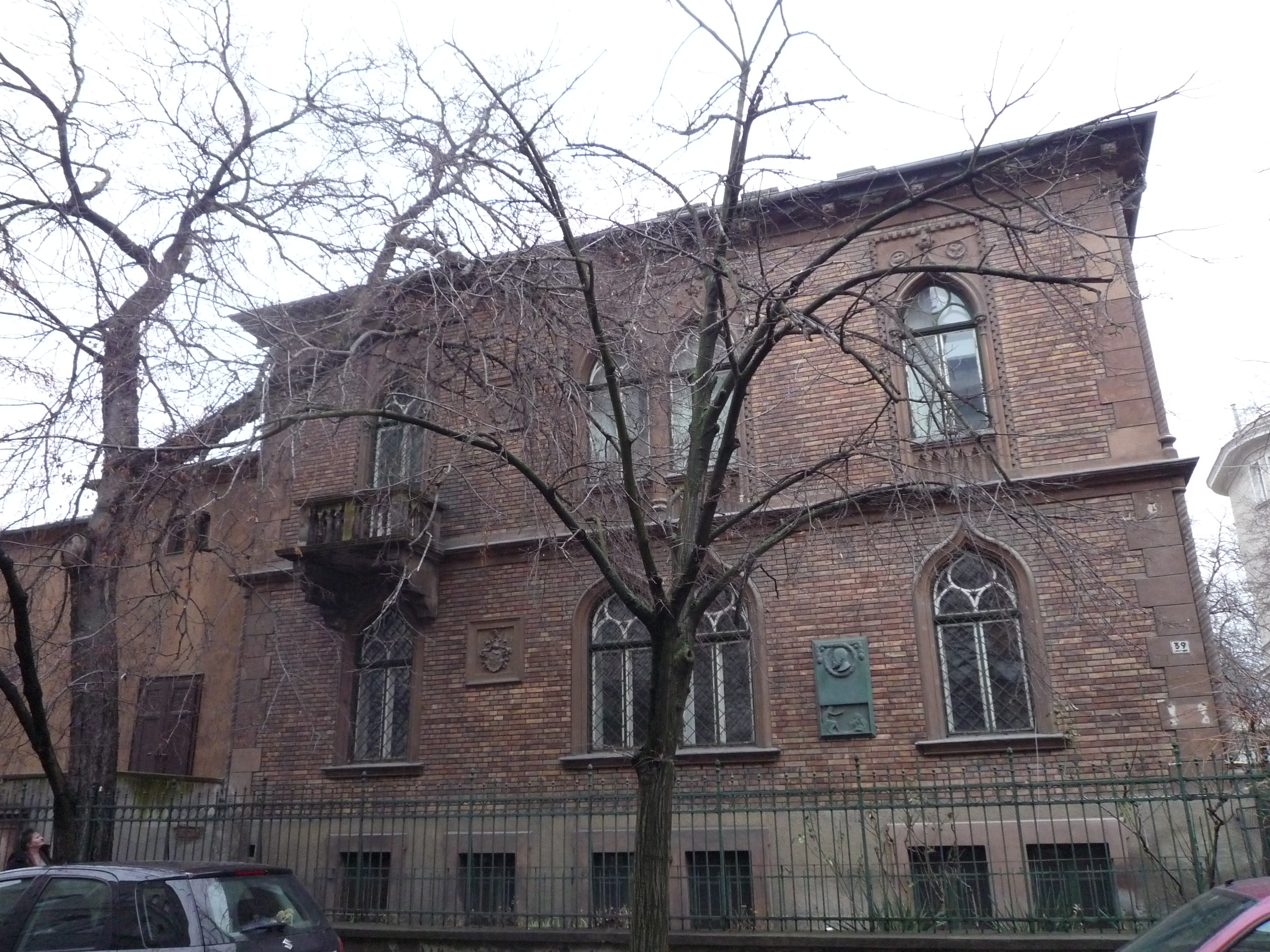
The Venetian Gothic Feszty-Jókai Palace

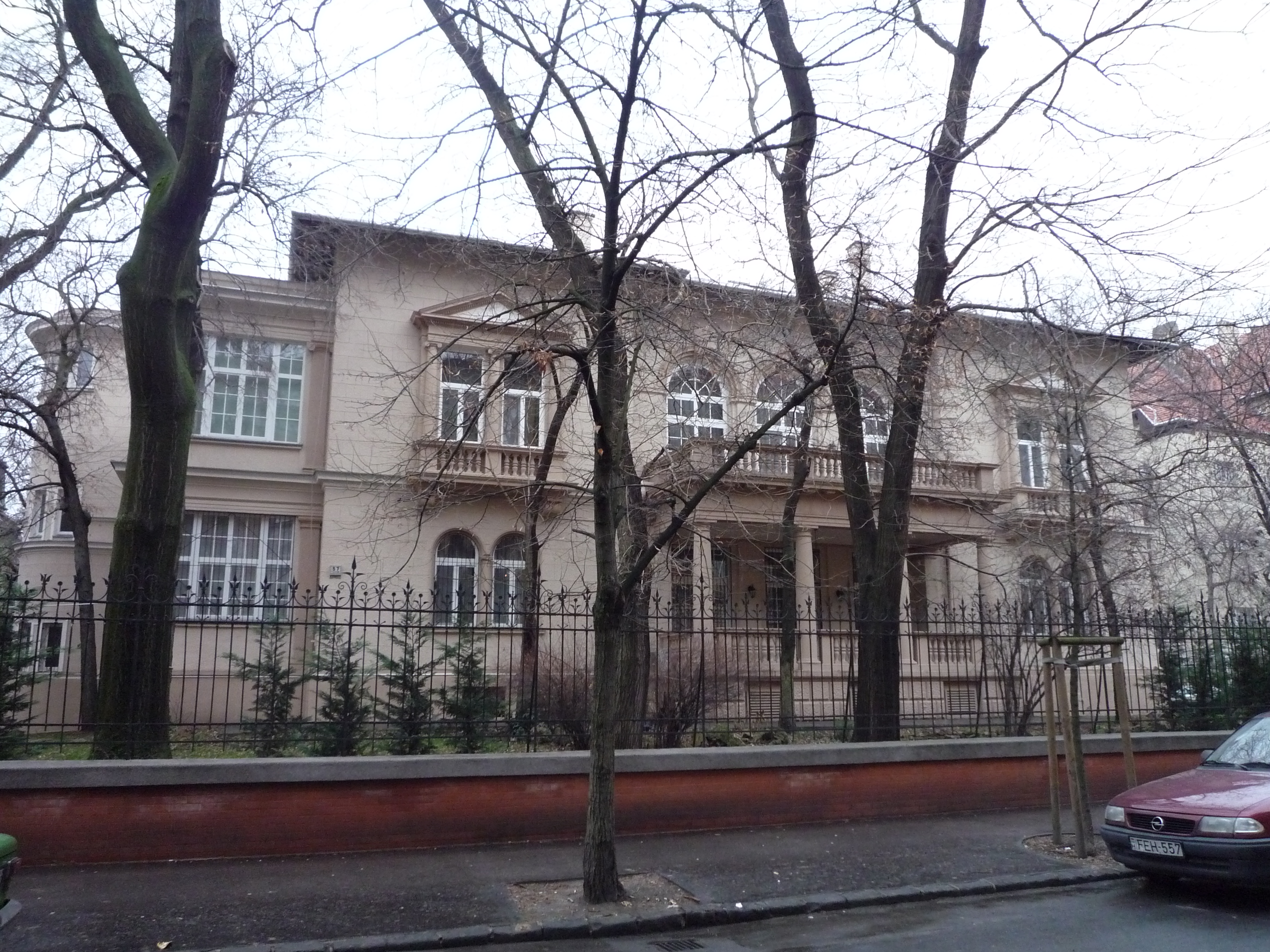
The former Villa Huszár was thoroughly rebuilt in the 1920s

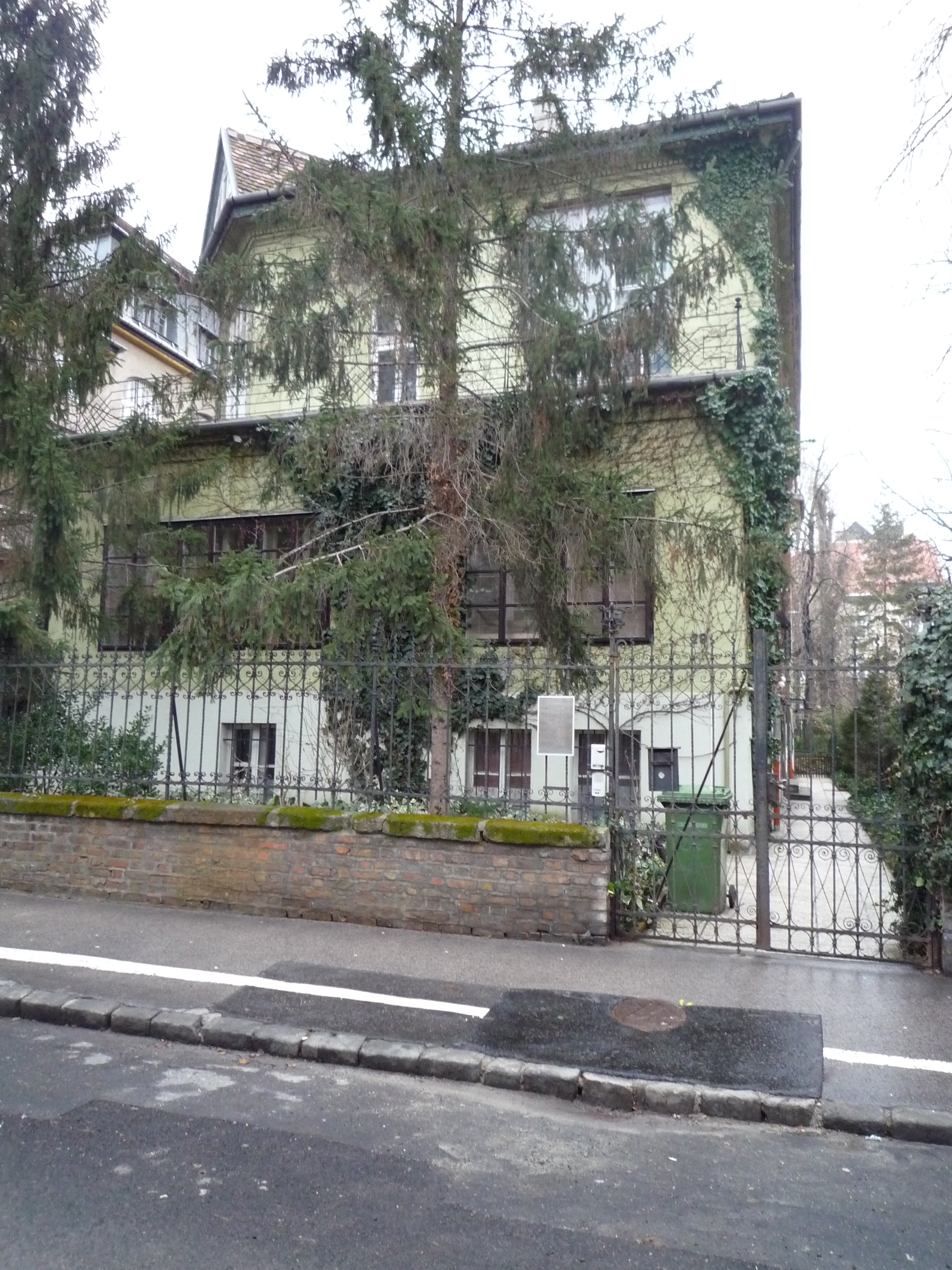
Atelier Kernstok in Kmety Street

== Sources ==
- Eszter Gábor: Az epreskerti művésztelep, in: Az Andrássy út körül, Osiris, 2010, pp. 201–255
