= Intra Asia Network =

The Intra Asia Network, or IAN, is a loose consortium of cultural workers and creative spaces, artist exchange projects, community engagement initiatives and artist residency programmes operating throughout Asia. This consortium was founded to facilitate the greater mobility of Asia's cultural producers, practitioners, and creative people through the development, promotion and empowerment of artist-in-residency and artist-in-community projects. Membership represents over 15 countries and hundreds of Asian art spaces and initiatives.

== History of IAN ==
Through the support of Asian Cultural Council Taiwan and other local and funders, a meeting of 35 Asian artist directors from 15 countries was held in July 2005 in Taiwan. The thrust of the gathering was to discuss the issues and difficulties concerning Asian artists’ mobility and cultural exchange. Asia is in need of understanding itself in both a traditional and contemporary context: a premise of IAN is that 21st century cultural identity in Asia will be understood through movements, projects, and residencies of its own culture workers. The Intra Asia Network for artist residency, mobility, and exchange now comprises members from Taiwan, Cambodia, Thailand, Japan, China, Korea, Vietnam, Indonesia, Malaysia, and even Australia and New Zealand.

A second meeting of IAN representatives was held, with the support of Asia Europe Foundation, during the annual conference of Res Artis in Berlin, convened by the ufaFabrik. That gathering involved the leaders of 40 Asian culture NGOs and reaffirmed the need for an action group to share knowledge, resources, experience and collaboration across Asian borders.

The third conference of IAN was held in South Korea in September 2006. The workshops were held in conjunction with the 2006 Gwangju Bienniale, while the second half of the gathering was held at Ssamzie Space in Seoul. The objectives focused on the common concerns of many Asian directors and cultural leaders: professional development, management of artist’s space and initiatives, and new models for funding, operating, and advocating for the role of artists' mobility and cultural exchange. This most recent gathering was co-sponsored by Artists Forum International (AFI), with support from Arts Council of Korea, City of Gwangju, the Korean Nonprofit Alternative Space Network, and the Prince Claus Fund.

== Background ==
Intra Asia Network is an open source platform for culture organizations.

Following the 2005 workshop and conferences, there was a consensus that a formal initiative be formed to help foster more intra-Asian exchanges and cultural dialogue. This objective was further confirmed at the more recent meeting of arts leaders in Seoul in September 2006. Thus Intra Asia Network, a collective consortium, has been established based on a shared vision to use Asian art and culture, and innovative project development, as the medium for a balanced social condition for all parts of Asia.

== Structure of Network ==
Intra Asia Network is an open source network to serve and support Asian culture organizations. It will not be formalized as a legal entity, but will remain as an autonomous, flexible and independently structured entity. Membership is free, and all share equally in rights and responsibilities to further the network’s mission. Contributions and commitments are on a voluntary basis. Communications for members and the general public is driven via a website, e-group, blogs and the Internet. Regional workshops and conferences will be planned as supportive opportunities and funding allow.
