= Res Artis =

Res Artis is the peak member organisation for the international arts residencies field comprising more than 700 vetted members in over 85 countries. Founded in 1993, it operates a website and the largest existing network of artist residency programs.

== History ==
Founded in 1993 in Berlin, Germany, through the volunteer efforts of the Board of Directors and countless partners and friends to represent and support the needs of residential arts centers and programs, Res Artis has grown to become the largest network of its kind. Through the dynamic exchange of information via its website and publications and through regional and international face-to-face meetings, it promotes the role of residential art programs as a vital part of the contemporary arts world, stimulating the creative development and mobility of artists, and furthering intercultural understanding. Res Artis founding members include Michael Haerdter and William Edward Smart Jr. (1933–2019).

Each of Res Artis' members is dedicated to offering artists, curators, and all manner of creative people the essential time and place away from the pressures and habits of every-day life, an experience framed within a unique geographic and cultural context. Through Res Artis, organisations become part of a global community of colleagues engaged in dialogue through face-to-face meetings and virtually through an extensive online presence.

Members of the organisation include a wide variety of facilities that may take the form of an art colony, an artist-run space, or other regional residency networks.

Res Artis promotes the understanding of the catalytic role residential arts centers play in the development of Contemporary Arts in all cultures worldwide and across all creative media. The organization has been cited for its work to further the international mobility of artists and the promotion of cultural exchange through art residencies.

== Conferences and meetings ==
The heart of the network is its face-to-face meetings. They provide opportunities for members to meet, discuss, and learn first-hand about the host location. These are venues for sharing experiences, ideas, and meals, getting to know one another not only as colleagues but as people.

These meetings are organised in partnership with a Res Artis member, a local residency space, or other organisation. Res Artis meetings can focus on a particular theme, issue, profile or geographic region.

== See also ==
- Artist collective
- Artist cooperative
- Art colony
