= Fernand Allard l'Olivier =

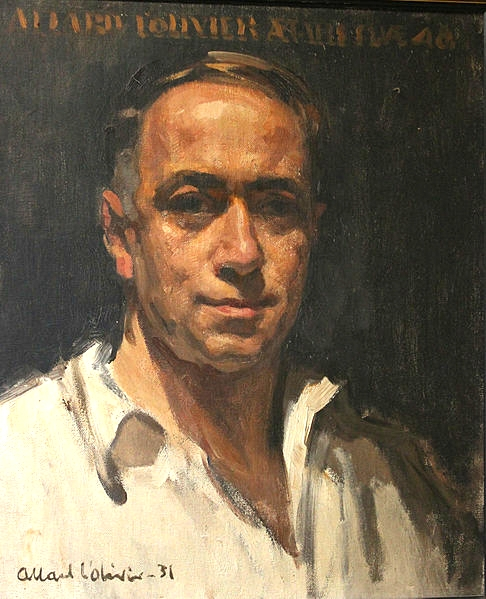
Self-portrait (1931)

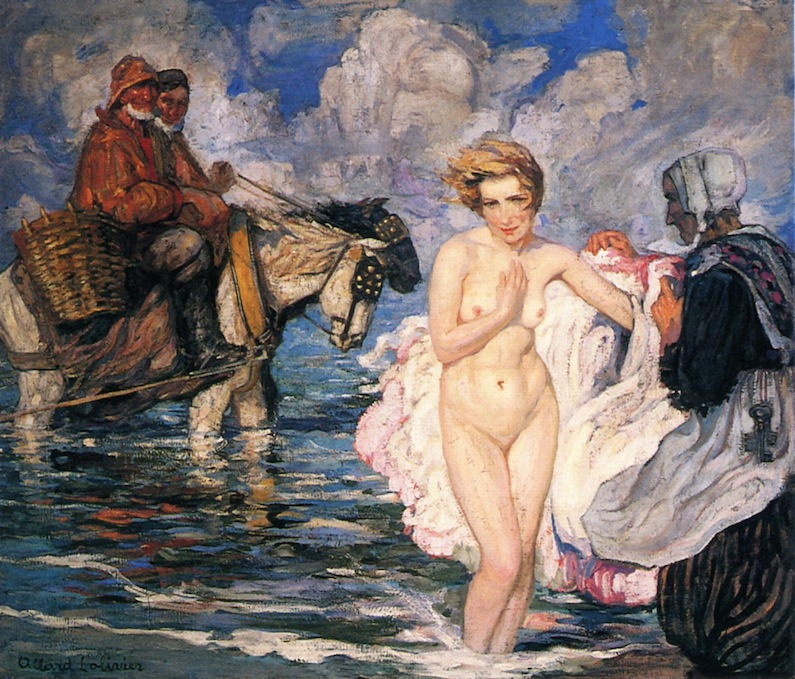
Bather in the North Sea (from his pre-African period, 1910)

Florent-Joseph-Fernand Allard, known as Fernand Allard l'Olivier (12 July 1883, Tournai – 9 June 1933, Yanongé, near Kisangani) was a Belgian painter and illustrator; known primarily for his works in the Africanist style.

== Biography ==
His father, Charles Allard, was an artist who had a lithography workshop and taught watercolors at the Académie des beaux-arts de Tournai. At the age of fourteen, he was apprenticed to the Imprimerie Van Campenhout in Molenbeek, where he learned his father's trade.

He went to Paris in 1901 and enrolled at the Académie Julian, where his primary instructors were William Bouguereau and Jean-Paul Laurens. It was, however, Jules Adler, who had the most influence on him; encouraging him to paint ordinary people, rather than historical or classical scenes. For his first works, he chose the pseudonym L'Olivier, taken from his maternal grandmother, the once popular novelist, Pauline L'Olivier. In the early part of his career, he was best known for his nudes.

In 1912, he married Juliette Rossignol, the daughter of a bookseller. The following year, she gave birth to a son, André, who would become a well known poet. During this period, he also worked as an art critic. Later, they decided to settle in Penmarch, as they felt it would be a better place to raise a family.

When World War I began, he attempted to enlist in a Belgian regiment, but was never called up. In 1916, as the war dragged on, he offered his services to the new camouflage section of the Belgian Army, then was transferred to the "Section artistique de l'armée belge en campagne". For two years, from his base in De Panne, he made forays into the trenches to sketch and paint. After the war, he and his family moved to Brussels. In 1920, he published a sketch book called Alphabet de guerre (Alphabet of the War). He continued to participate in exhibits at the Salon until 1928.

=== Visits to Africa ===
During this period, he made several trips; to Tunisia in 1923 and, in 1926, to Poland, where he created decorative paintings in Łódź. In 1928, his friend, the filmmaker Ernest Genval, paid a visit to what was then the Belgian Congo and invited L'Olivier to join him. He was able to obtain money from the Colonial Ministry, by promising to bring back artistic documents for an upcoming exhibition. He met Genval in Dar es Salaam and they proceeded to what is now Katanga Province, where he set up his workshop and travelled throughout the region, painting and collecting souvenirs. He returned to Belgium early in 1929 and prepared his works for an exhibit in Antwerp.

In 1931, the world depression began to take its toll on his financial affairs. Plans for a large exhibition fell through. This prompted him to pay a second visit to Africa. In late 1932, he arrived by ship at Matadi. After spending several months visiting previously unseen places in the western Congo, he went to Léopoldville in January, 1933. There he was wined and dined by his old acquaintances until he wrote home complaining that he had no time to work. He eventually went upriver for several weeks, meeting with local dignitaries, both native and colonial. He also travelled around Lake Tanganyika and visited what is now Burundi.

By April, he had created a sufficient number of works to be planning exhibitions in Costermansville and Léopoldville, after which his wife would meet him in Tenerife on the voyage home. In June, he was heading to Léopoldville on a river tugboat, when it made an overnight stop. At one point, while he was chatting with some people, he excused himself and headed toward his cabin. A few moments later there was a loud splash. His body was retrieved from the river three days later. The autopsy revealed a fractured skull. Nobody there could say exactly what had happened.

His works may be seen at the Musée Royal de l'Armée et de l'Histoire Militaire, Musée royal de l'Afrique centrale, Musée des Beaux-Arts de Tournai, In Flanders Fields Museum, Musée des Beaux-Arts de Pau, Muzeum Sztuki Łódź and the Musées d'art et d'histoire de Genève.

== Selected Africanist paintings ==
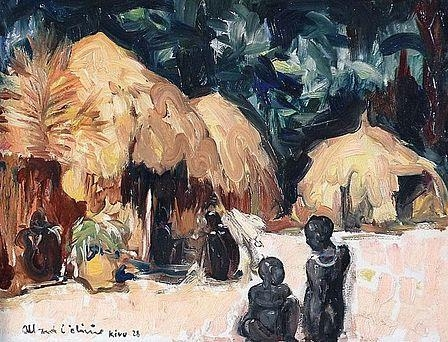
A Village in Kivu

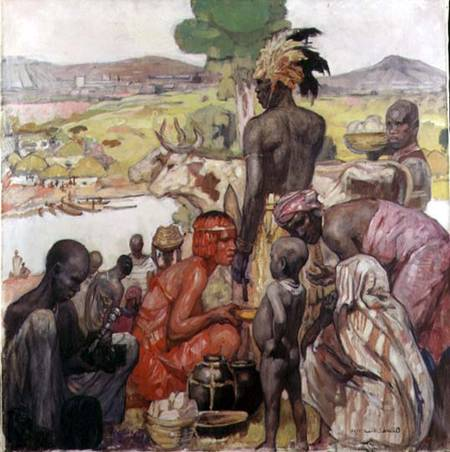
View of Matadi

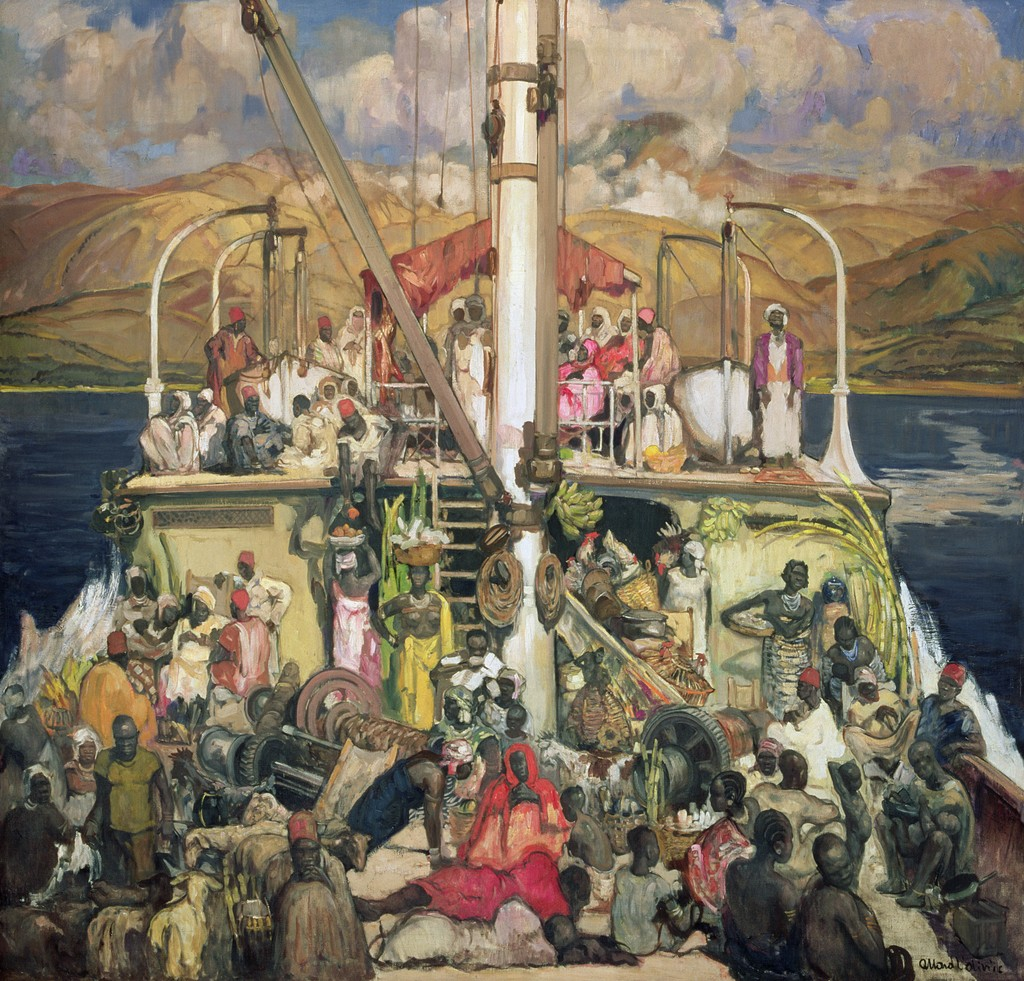
The Ferry

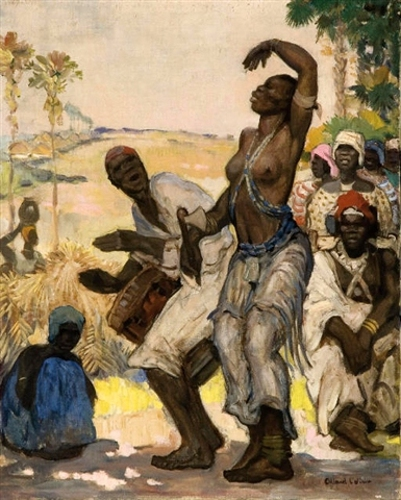
The Dancer and the Musician

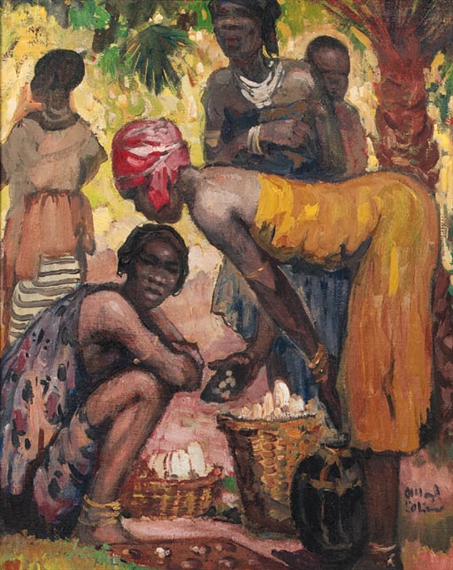
The Market
