= List of historic properties in Tucson, Arizona =

Historic properties in Tucson, Arizona

- City
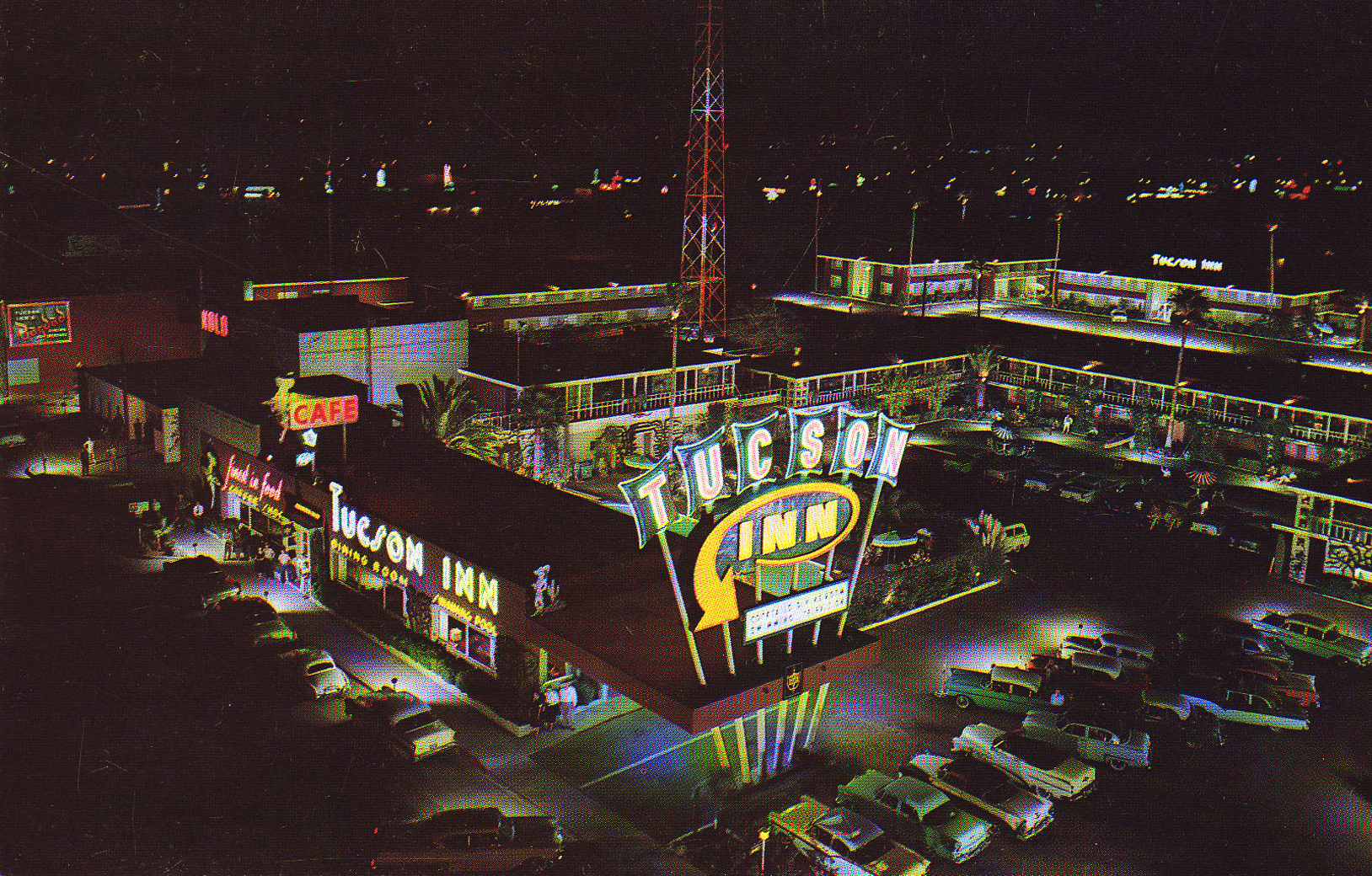
- The Tucson Inn, 1956 (Miracle Mile Historic District)

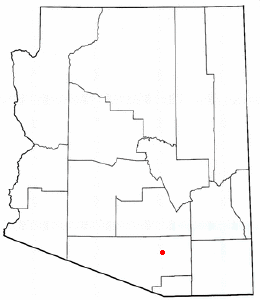
- Location in Pima County and the state of Arizona
- Country: United States

This is a list of historic properties in Tucson, Arizona, which includes a photographic gallery of some of the remaining historic structures. Tucson is a city and the county seat of Pima County. It is the second-largest populated city in Arizona behind Phoenix. Included in this list are the photographs of some of the districts. buildings and individual properties identified as historic by the National Register of Historic Places. Also included are images related to the historic Fort Lowell which was an active United States Army post from 1873 to 1891 on the outskirts of Tucson.

== Brief history ==
It is unknown exactly when and who were the first Native-American tribes to settle in the Tucson Valley. However, archaeologists have found evidence of agricultural settlements along the Santa Cruz River and have dated these settlements back to 1080 BC.

There was an era when the Hohokams lived and farmed in the valley. This was between 200 and 1450. It is commonly believed that the Pima and Tohono O'odham are the descendants of the Hohokams and that they continued to inhabit the region.

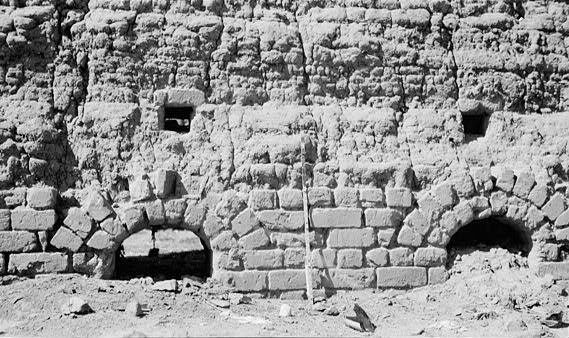
Adobe Brickwork of the Kilns arched openings, built by Spanish colonists in the 18th century.

In 1540, Francisco Vázquez de Coronado led an expedition through Arizona in search of transportable riches, rumored to be in the "Seven Cities of Cibola". Coronado and his men were the first Europeans to explore the area, however the "Seven Cities of Cibola", whose structures were supposed to be made of gold, was only a myth. In 1699, Father Eusebio Francisco Kino arrived in the valley and decided to establish a Catholic mission. The mission church, which he named Mission San Xavier del Bac, was not completed until 1797, almost a hundred years later.

The City of Tucson was officially established in 1775, the year that Hugo Oconór established the Tucson Presidio. O'Connor was born in 1732 in Dublin, Ireland. He moved to Spain where he changed the spelling of his surname to the Spanish sounding "Oconór" and joined the regiment of Volunteers of Aragon. Oconór, a.k.a. "The Founding Father of Tuson" was a military governor of northern Mexico. Tucson, became part of Mexico in 1821, when Mexico fought for and gained its independence from Spain.

In 1854, Tucson ceased to be part of Mexico and became a United States Territory (New Mexico Territory) as a result of Gadsden Purchase. The Confederacy established the Arizona Territory in February 1862 using the east–west boundary after the American Civil War began. They named Tucson their Arizona Territory capital. The United States, on the other hand, created the Arizona Territory in 1863 using the current state boundary. On May 20, 1862, the California Volunteers led by Captain Emil Fritz secured Tucson without firing a single shot. Arizona became an official United States territory in 1863 and Tucson served as the territorial capitol between 1867 and 1877.

== The Tucson Historic Preservation Foundation ==
The Tucson Historic Preservation Foundation was established in March 1984. The foundations mission is to save Tucson's neon signs and list numerous properties on the National Register of Historic Places. However, the Tucson Historic Preservation Foundation does not have the ability to deny a demolition permit. Owners of a property, listed in the National Register of Historic Places, may demolish the historical property if desired. According to Jim McPherson, Arizona Preservation Foundation Board President:

It is crucial that residents, private interests, and government officials act now to save these elements of our cultural heritage before it is too late.

Such was the fate of the MacArthur Building which was built in 1907 as the "Hotel Heide". In 1944, the building was remodeled and renamed the "MacArthur Hotel". The building which is located at 345 Toole Ave. was listed in the National Register of Historic Places on December 13, 1983, and its NRHP reference number was #82002089. A partial collapse of one side led to a new facade being put on the building and therefore it was delisted from the National Register of Historic Places in 1984. The city purchased the building for $2.9 million in 2005 and in 2008, sold it to the Madden Media for $1.7 million.

== Properties pictured ==
=== Districts/Barrios ===
According to the National Trust for Historic Preservation: "a local historic district is an entire area or group of historic structures deemed significant to the city's cultural fabric that are protected by public review. This can include downtown commercial areas, main streets, waterfront districts, and residential districts." Barrios is the plural of barrio, a Spanish word for district or neighborhood. Tucson has thirty four historic Districts/Barrios and eight historic Archeological Districts. The National Register is the official Federal list of districts, sites, and objects significant in American history, architecture, archeology, engineering, and culture. The following Districts/Barrios are pictured and/or have images related to them:

- Armory Park Historic Residential District. Location: E. 12th St. to 19th St., Stone Ave. to 2nd Ave.; also roughly 19th, 20th, and 21st Sts. from Stone Ave. to Jacobus Ave.; listed in the National Register of Historic Places on July 30, 1976, references:#76000378, 96000754. (note: The second NRHP reference represents a boundary increase on July 5, 1996)
- Blenman-Elm Historic District. Location: Bounded by Grant, Country Club, Speedway, and Campbell Ave.; listed in the National Register of Historic Places on October 29, 2003, reference: #03000318.
- Catalina Vista Historic District. Location: Bounded by Grant, Tucson Boulevard, Elm St., and Campbell Ave.; listed in the National Register of Historic Places on October 29, 2003, reference: #03000317.

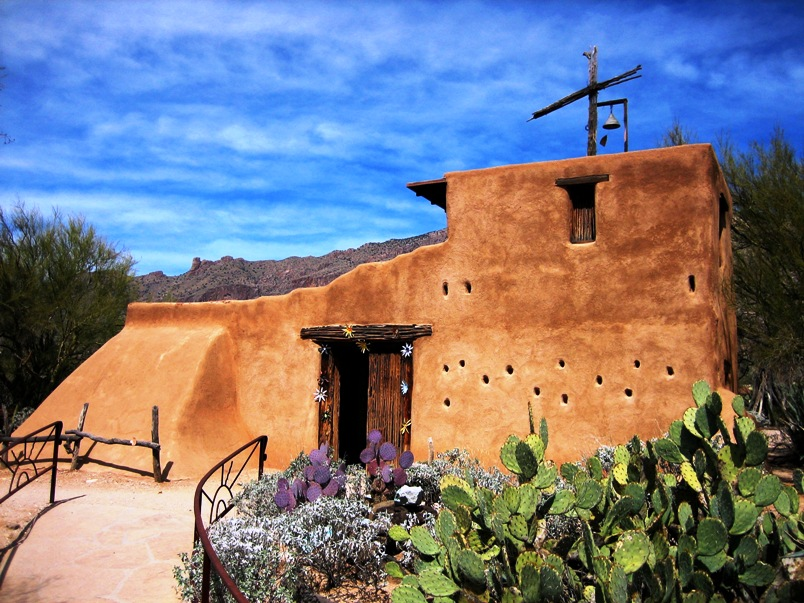
DeGrazia Mission

- DeGrazia Gallery in the Sun Historic District. Pictured is Ettore DeGrazia's studio and home. Location: 6300 N. Swan Rd.; listed in the National Register of Historic Places on October 12, 2006, reference: #06000932.
- El Encanto Estates Residential Historic District. Location: Roughly bounded by Country Club Rd., Broadway Boulevard, 5th St., and Jones St.; also roughly bounded by E. Speedway Boulevard, N. Country Club Rd., E. Broadway Boulevard, and N. Campbell Ave.; listed in the National Register of Historic Places on January 29, 1988, references: #87002284, 00001363. (note: The second NRHP reference represents a boundary increase on September 29, 1994).
- El Montevideo Historic District. Location: 3700 and 3800 blocks of streets between Broadway and 5th St.; also the 3700 and 3800 blocks of Camino Del Norte; also roughly bounded by 5th St., Broadway Boulevard, Alvernon Way, and Ridge Dr.; listed in the National Register of Historic Places on September 12, 1994, references: #94001070, 00001362, 07001335. (note: Second and third sets of references are related to the boundary increases of December 1, 2000 and December 29, 2007).
- El Presidio Historic District. Location: Roughly bounded by W. 6th and W. Alameda Sts. and N. Stone and Granada Aves.; listed in the National Register of Historic Places on September 27, 1976, references: #76000379.
- Feldman's Historic District. The name was changed from "Speedway-Drachman Historic District". The district was named after Alther M. Feldman, homesteader and photographer. Location: Roughly bounded by Lee St., Park Ave., Speedway Boulevard, 7th Ave., Drachman St., and 2nd Ave. Also, generally north of E. Speedway Boulevard, west of N. Park Ave., south of E. Lee St., and east of N. 7th St.; listed in the National Register of Historic Places on September 21, 1989, references: #89001460, 08000752.
- Fourth Avenue Commercial Historic District. Location: 4th Ave. from approx. 4th to 9th Sts.; listed in the National Register of Historic Places on October 12, 2017, reference: #100001726.
- Iron Horse Expansion Historic District. Location: Roughly bounded by 8th St., Euclid Ave., Hughes, and 10th Sts., and N. 4th and Hoff Aves.; listed in the National Register of Historic Places on June 6. 1986, reference: #86001347.
- Marist College Historic District. Location: 72 W. Ochoa St.; listed in the National Register of Historic Places on October 25, 2011, reference: #11000760.
- Menlo Park Historic District. Location: 13 Subdivisions irregularly bounded around Grande Ave. and W. Congress St. intersection; listed in the National Register of Historic Places on April 23, 2010, reference: #10000201.
- Rillito Race Track Historic District. It was originally listed as "Rillito Racetrack-Chute". The current name represents a boundary increase of February 6, 2012. Location: 4502 N. 1st Ave; listed in the National Register of Historic Places on June 12, 1986, reference: #86001322.
- Rincon Heights Historic District. Location: Roughly bounded by 6th Street, Broadway Boulevard, Campbell Avenue, and Fremont Avenue; listed in the National Register of Historic Places on January 23, 2013, reference: #12001190.
- John Spring Neighborhood Historic District. Location: Roughly bounded by W. Speedway Boulevard, N. 9th Ave., W. 5th St., N. Main Ave., W. 2nd St., and N. 10th Ave; listed in the National Register of Historic Places on May 11, 1989, reference: #88002131.
- Tucson Community Center Historic District. Location: 180-260 S. Church Ave.; listed in the National Register of Historic Places on September 8, 2015, reference: #15000569.
- University of Arizona Campus Historic District. Location: Roughly bounded by E. 2nd St., N. Cherry Ave., E. 4th St., and Park Ave.; listed in the National Register of Historic Places on June 13, 1986, reference: #86001254.
- West University Historic District. Location: Roughly bounded by Speedway Boulevard, 6th St., and Park and Stone Aves.; listed in the National Register of Historic Places on December 10, 1980, reference: #80004240.
- Barrio Anita. Originally McKinley Park subdivision, recorded 1903. Named after Annie Hughes, sister of Sam Hughes. Location: Roughly bounded by W. Speedway Blvd., Union Pacific Railroad, N. Granada Ave., St. Mary's Rd. and I-10; listed in the National Register of Historic Places on September 23. 2011, reference: #11000682.
- Barrio El Hoyo Historic District. Location: Roughly bounded by W. Cushing St. on the north, W. 18th St. on the south, S. 11th Ave. on the east, and S. Samaniego Ave. on the west.; listed in the National Register of Historic Places on August 13, 2008, reference: #08000763.
- Barrio El Membrillo Historic District. Location: Bounded by W. Granada St. on the north, W. Simpson St. on the south, and the right-of-way of the former El Paso and Southwestern railroad line on the east; listed in the National Register of Historic Places on August 5. 2009, reference: #09000583.
- Barrio Libre. Location: Roughly bounded by 14th, 19th, Stone and Osborne Sts.; listed in the National Register of Historic Places on October 18, 1978, reference: #78000565.
- Barrio Santa Rosa. Location: Roughly bounded by W. 18th St., S. Russell Ave., W. 22nd St., S. 9th Ave., & S. Meyer Ave.; listed in the National Register of Historic Places on September 23, 2011, reference: #11000683.
Historic Districts/Barrios
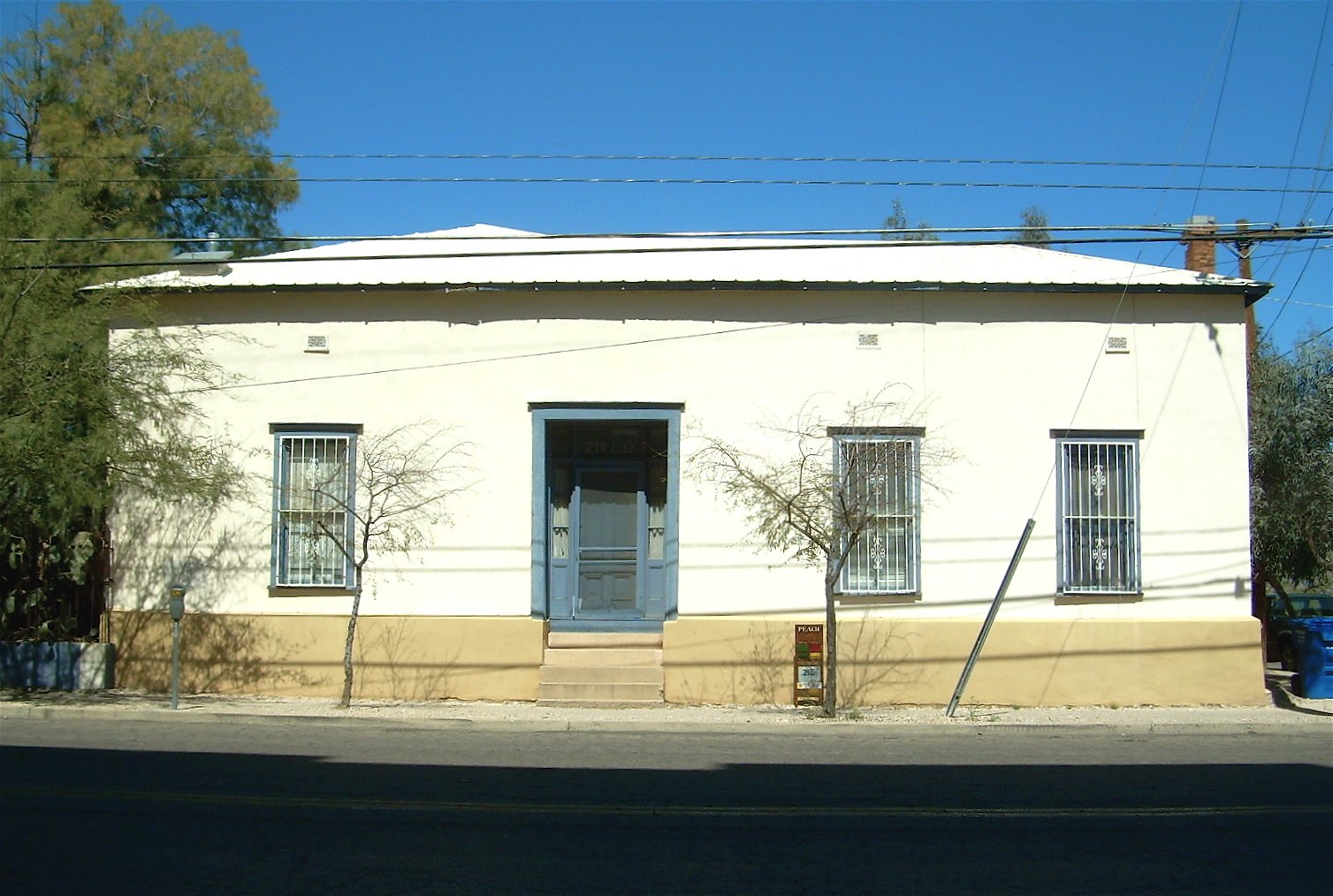
Armory Park Historic Residential District.

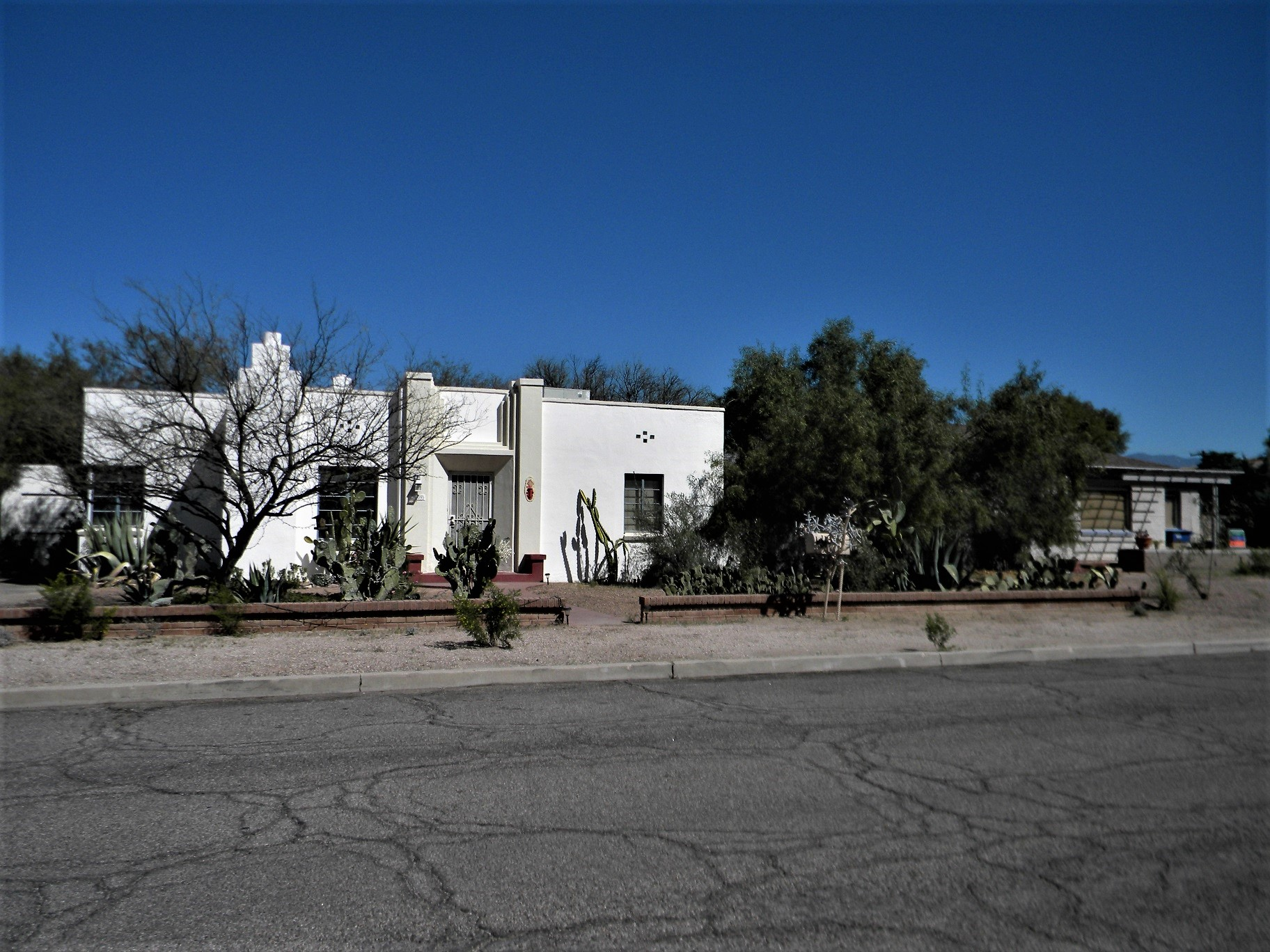
Blenman-Elm Historic District.

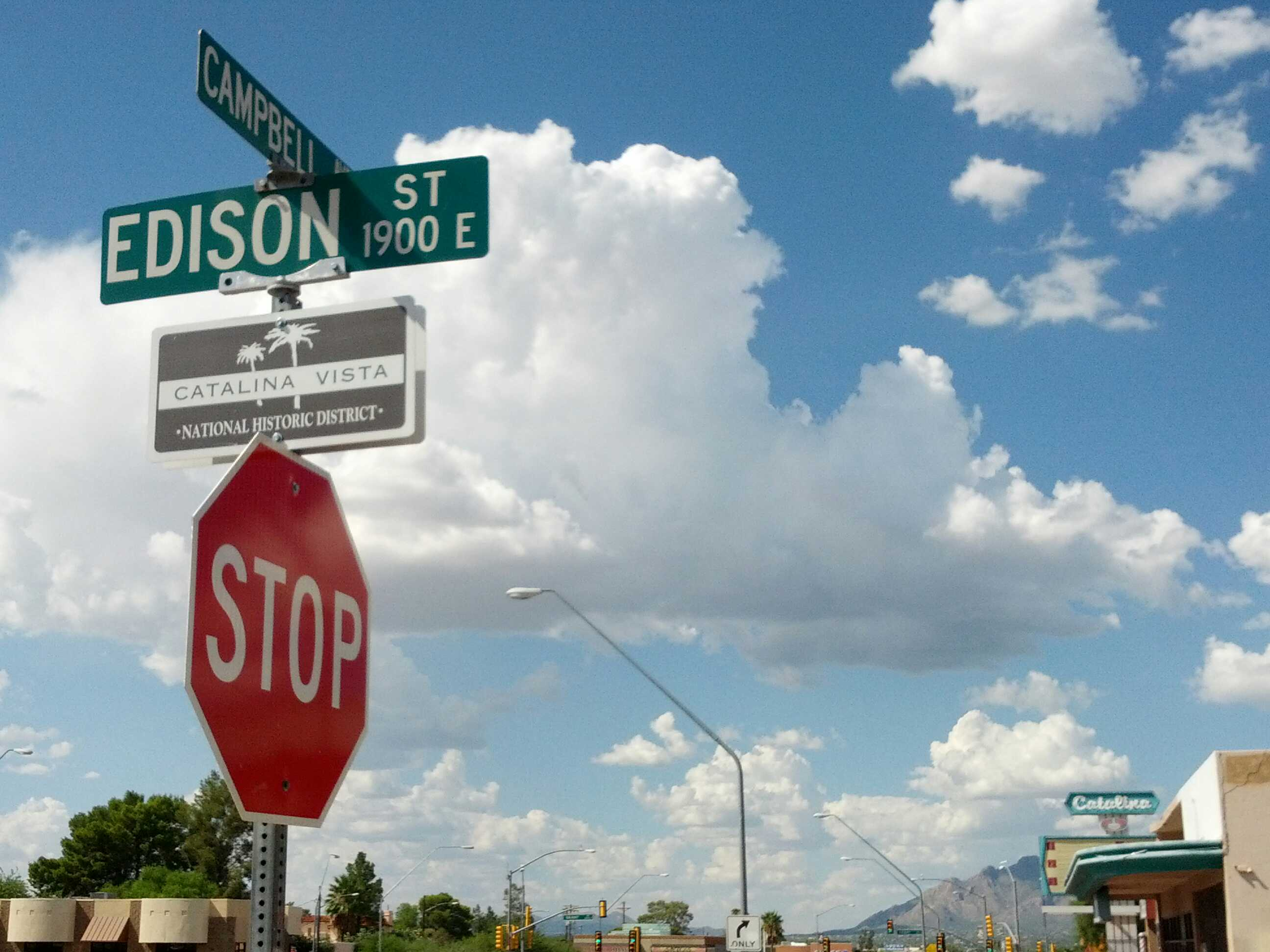
Catalina Vista Historic District street corner sign.

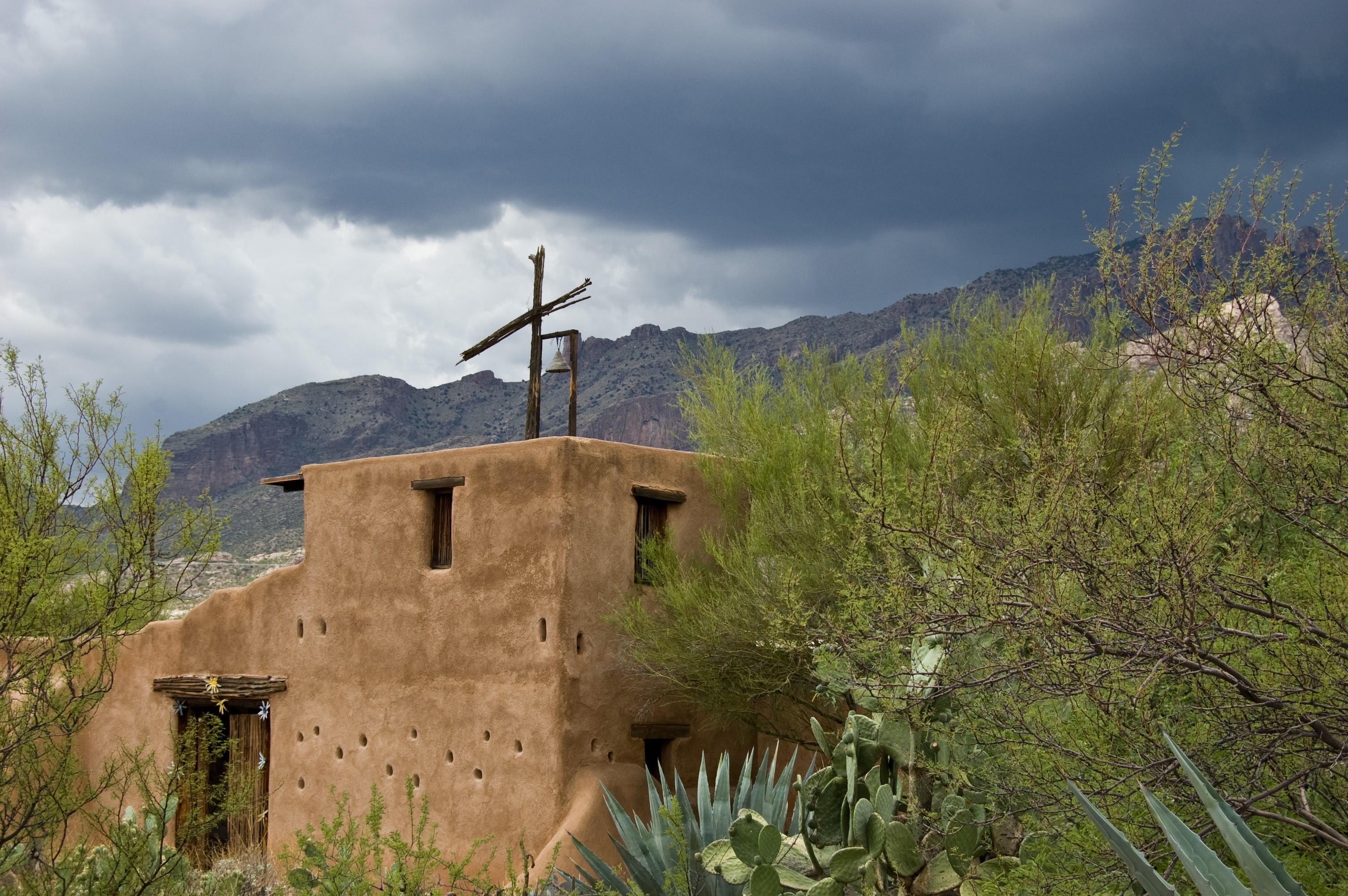
DeGrazia Gallery in the Sun Historic District.

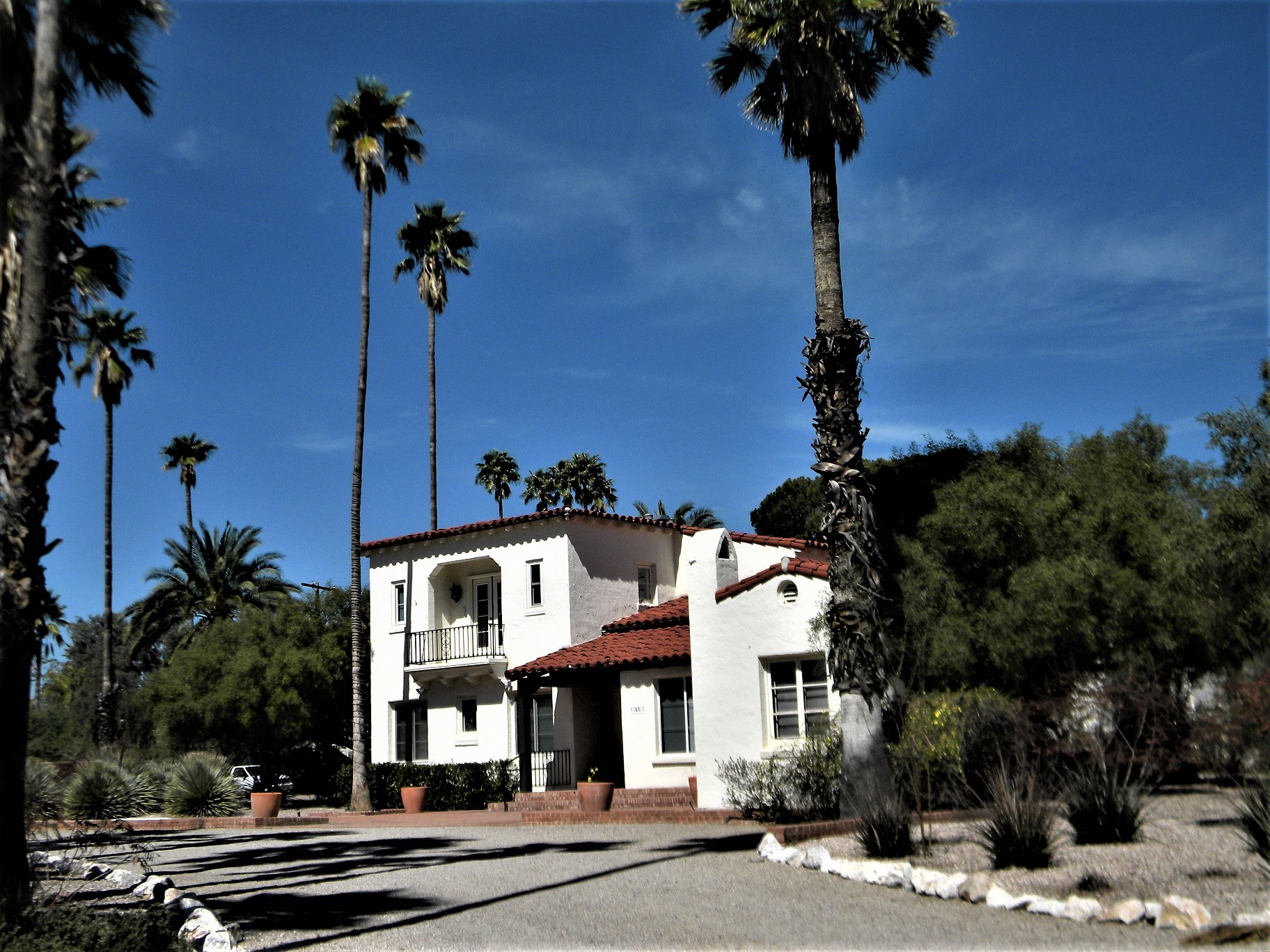
El Encanto Estates Residential Historic District.

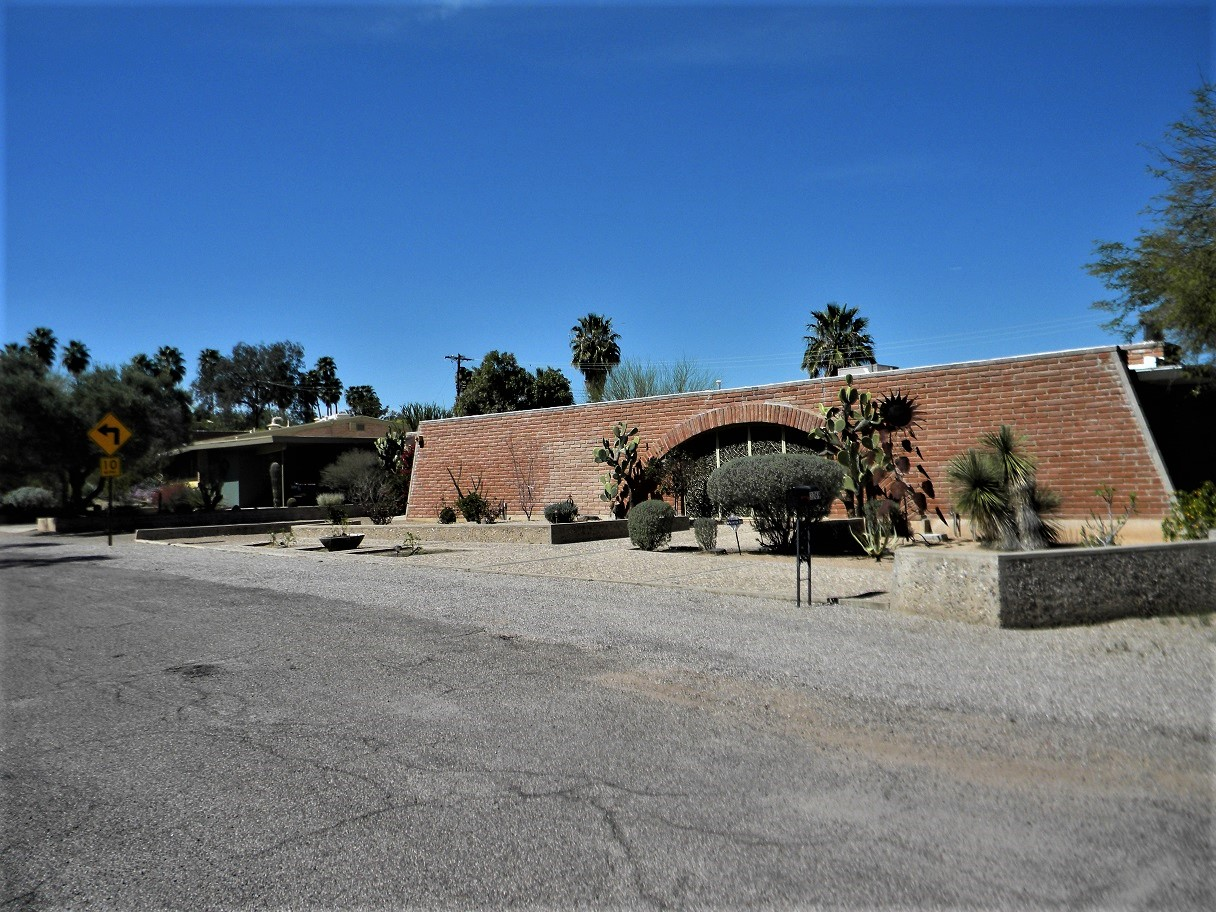
El Montevideo Historic District.

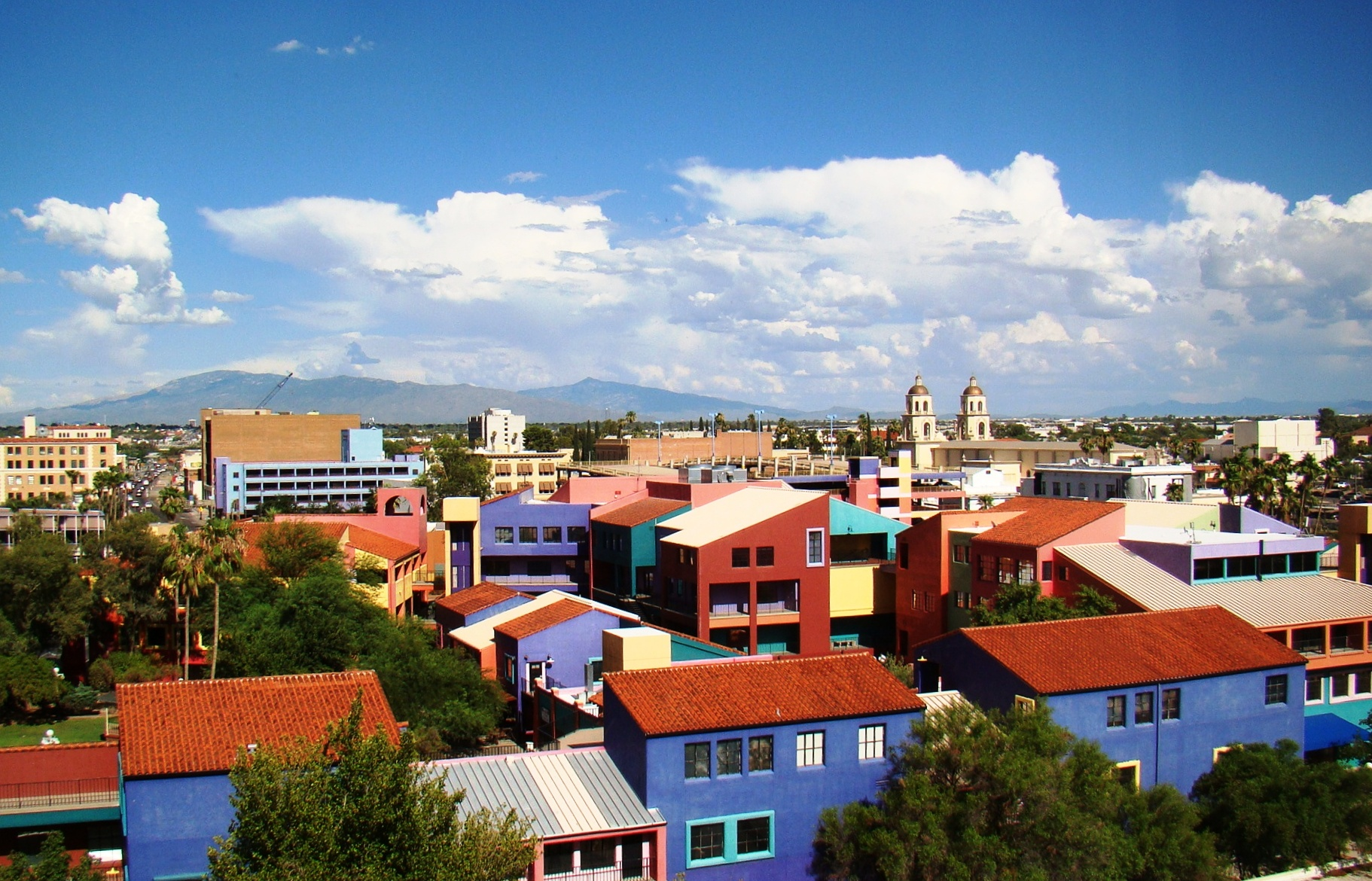
El Presidio Historic District.

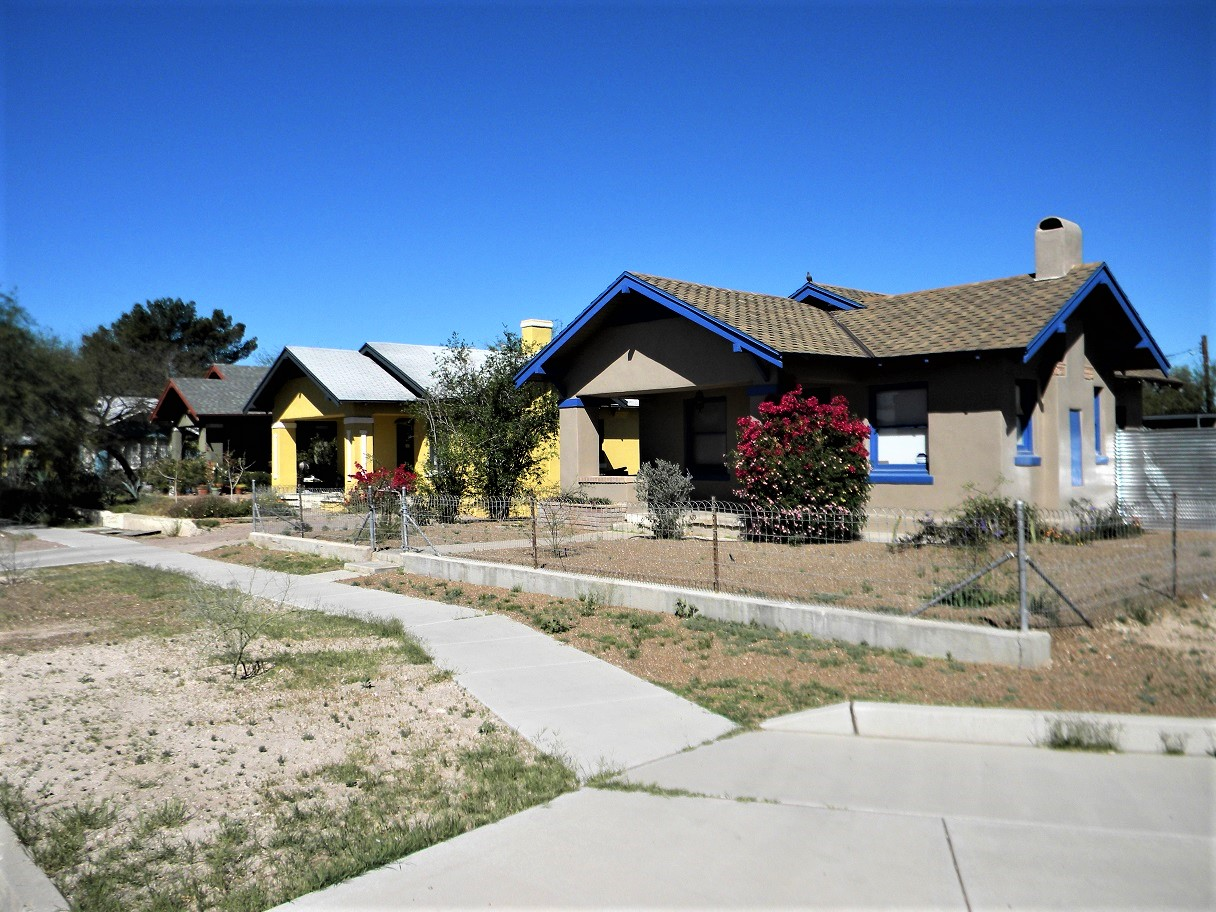
Feldman's Historic District.

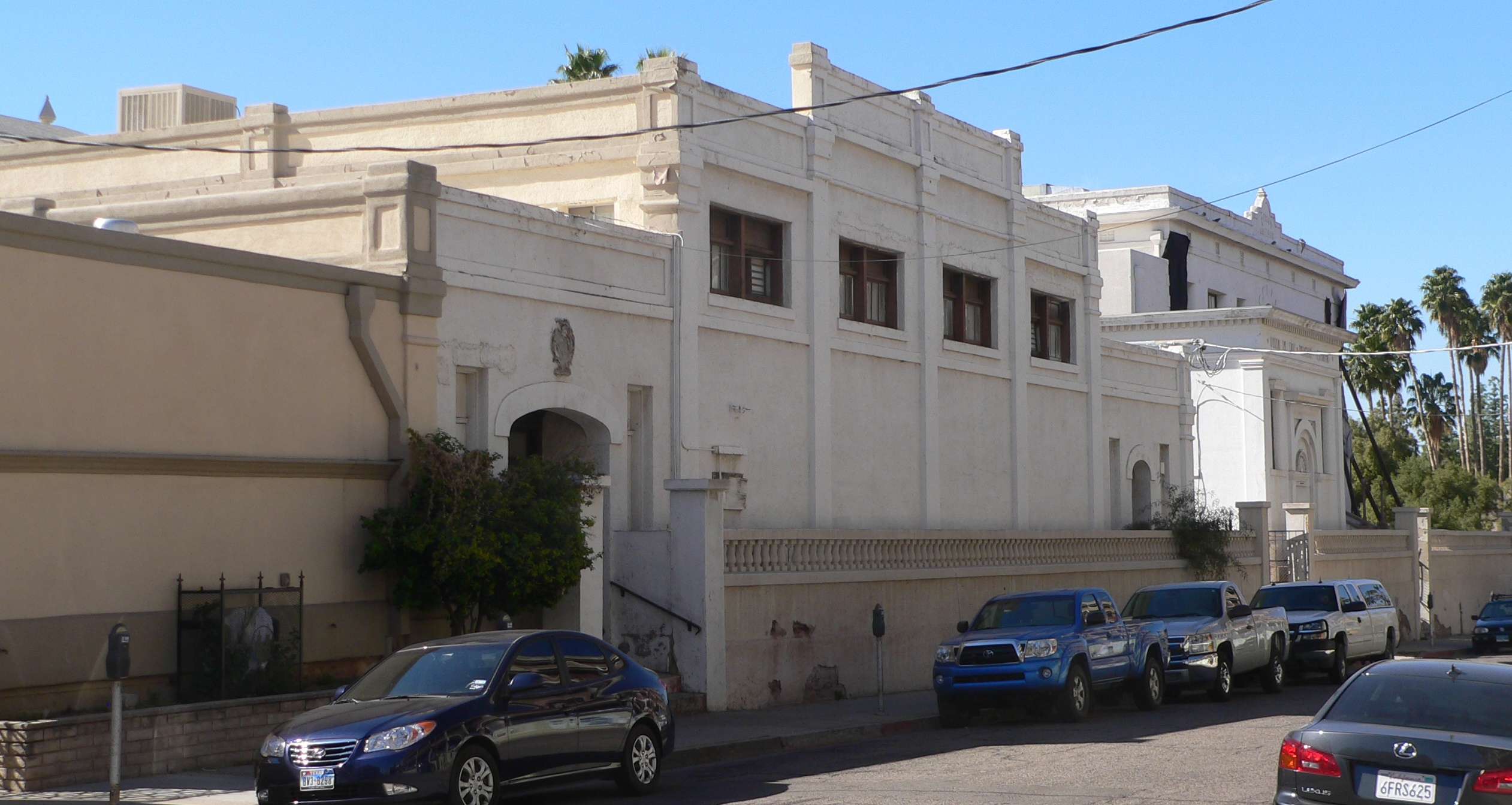
Marist College Historic District.

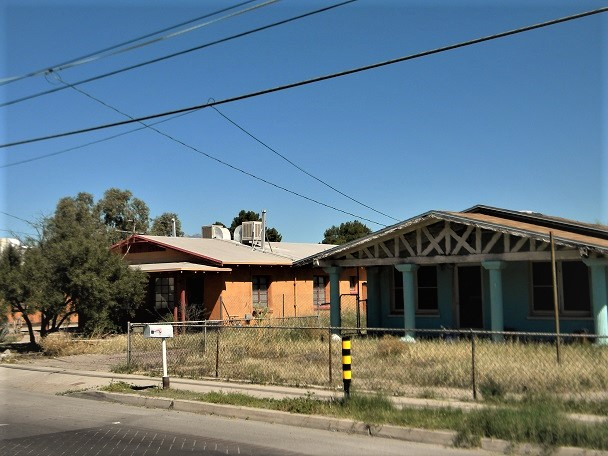
Menlo Park Historic District.

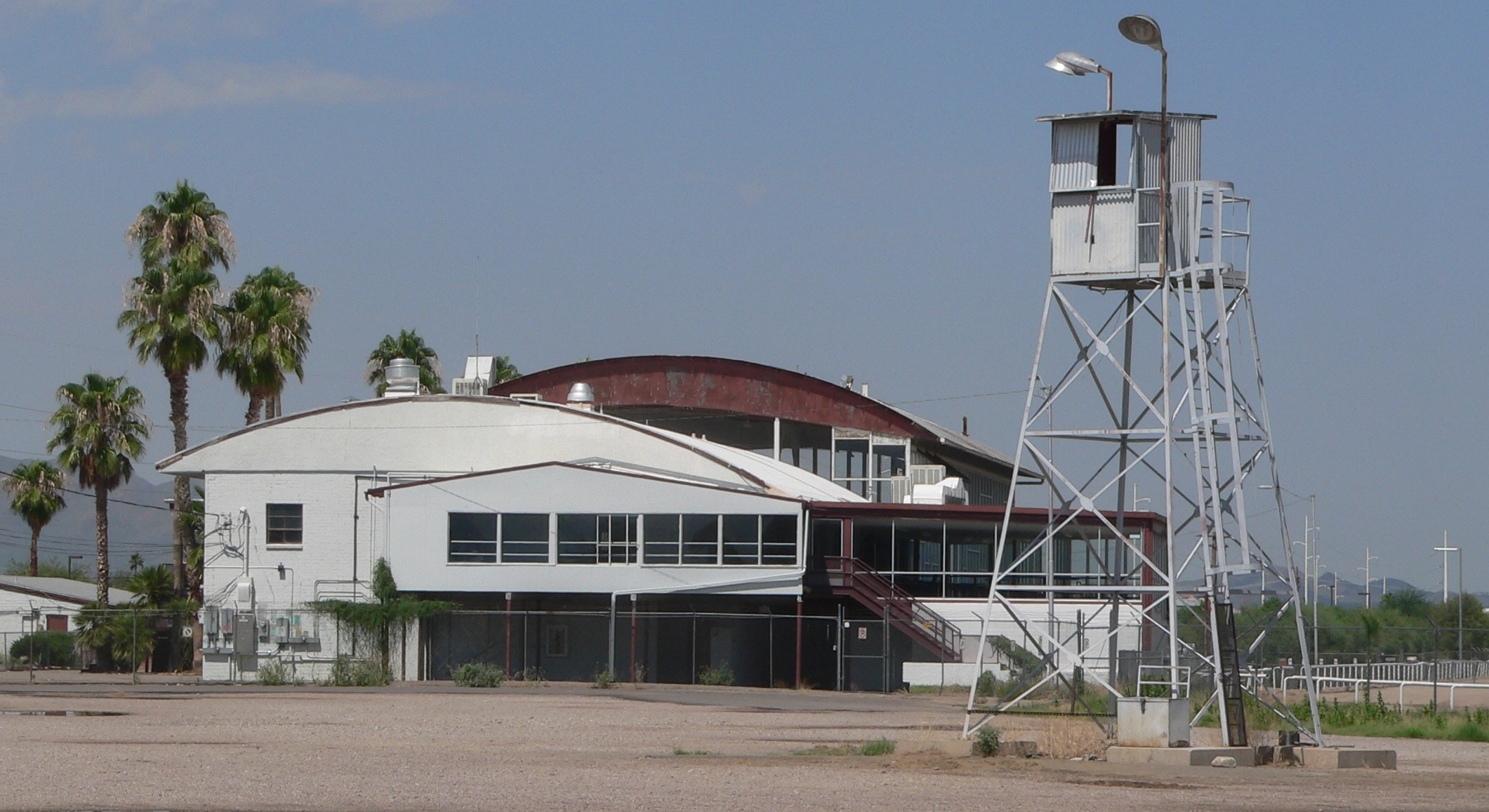
Rillito Race Track Historic District.

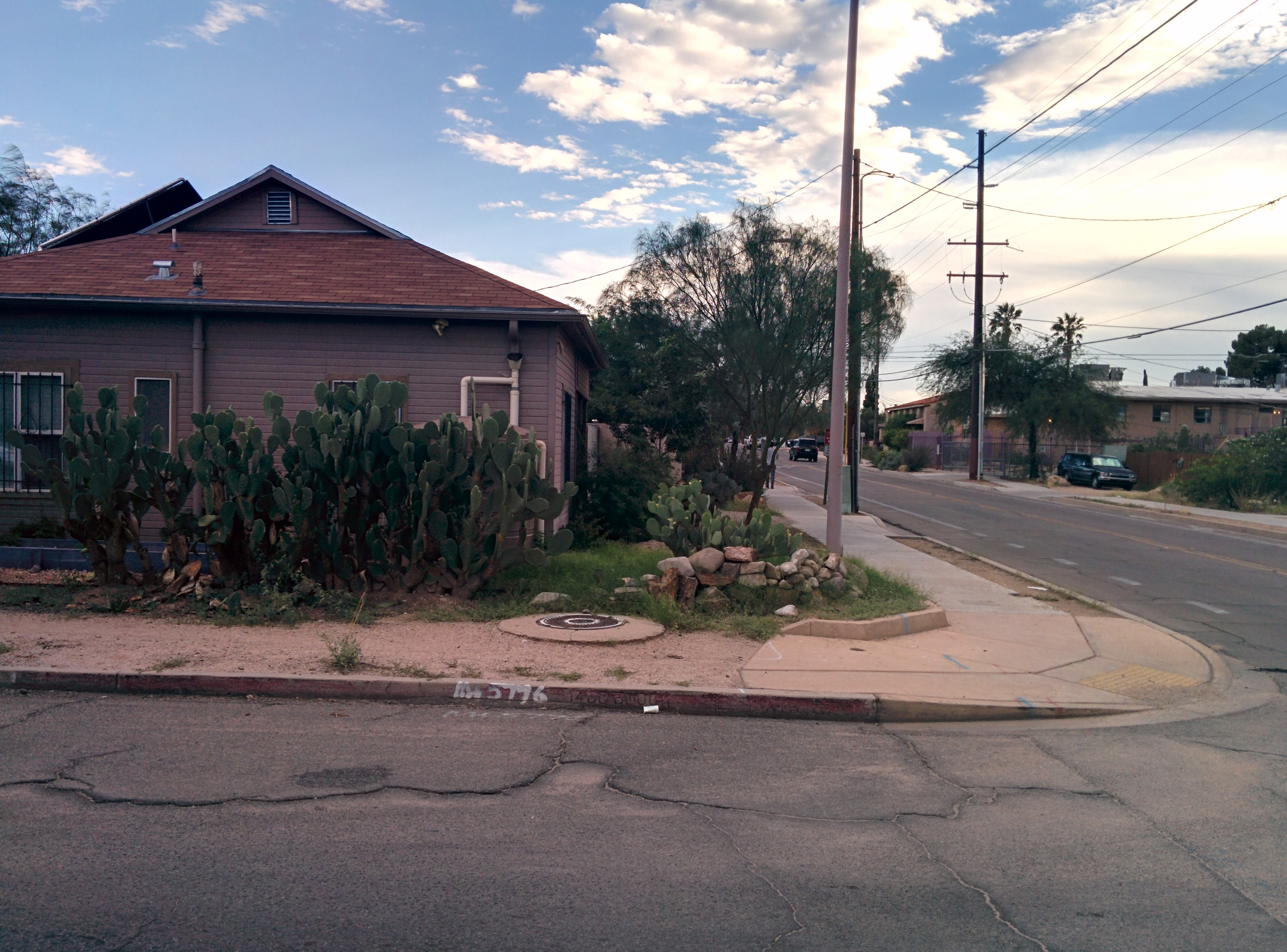
Rincon Heights Historic District.

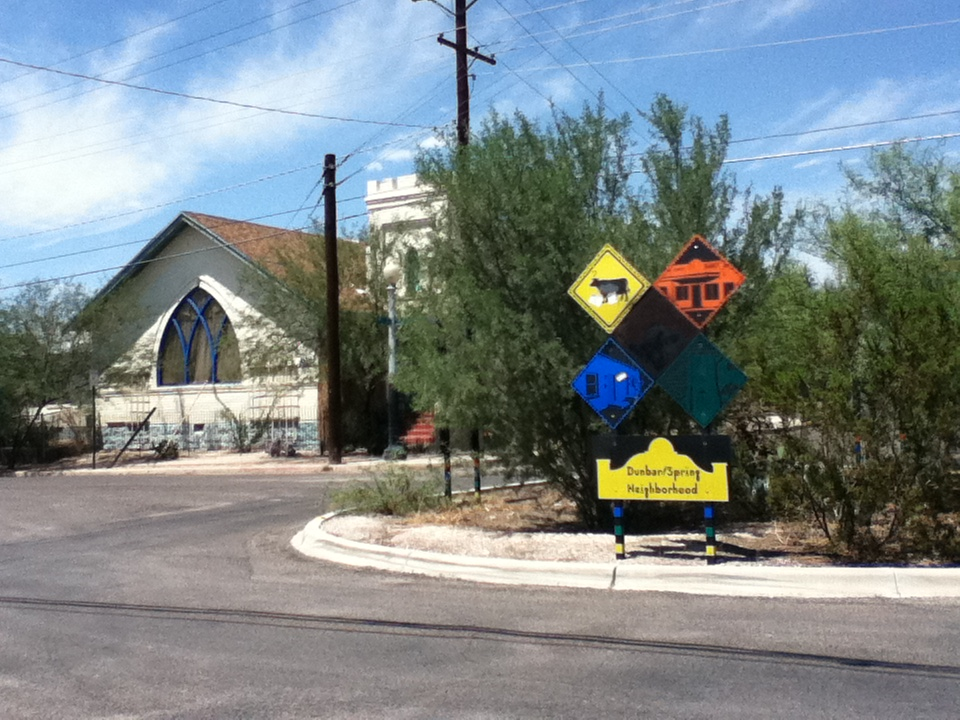
John Spring Neighborhood Historic District.

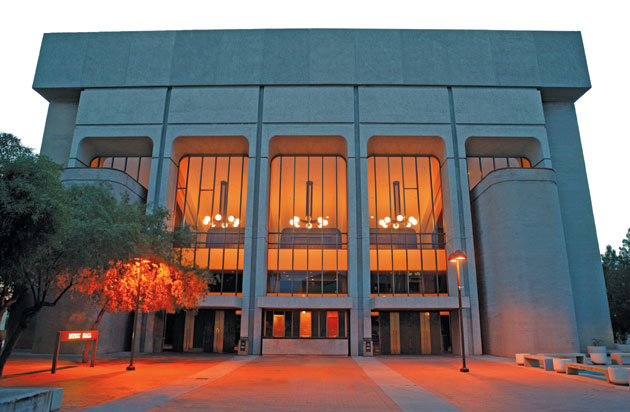
Tucson Community Center Historic District.

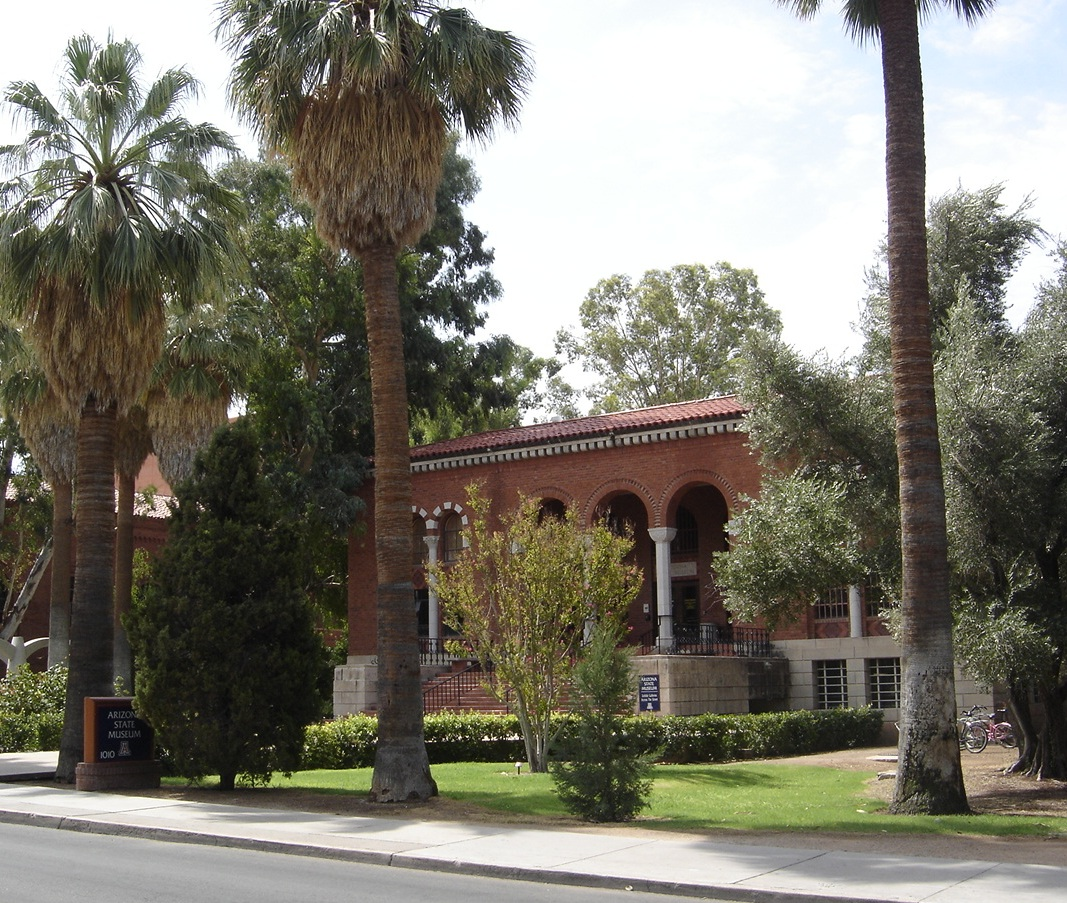
University of Arizona Campus Historic District.

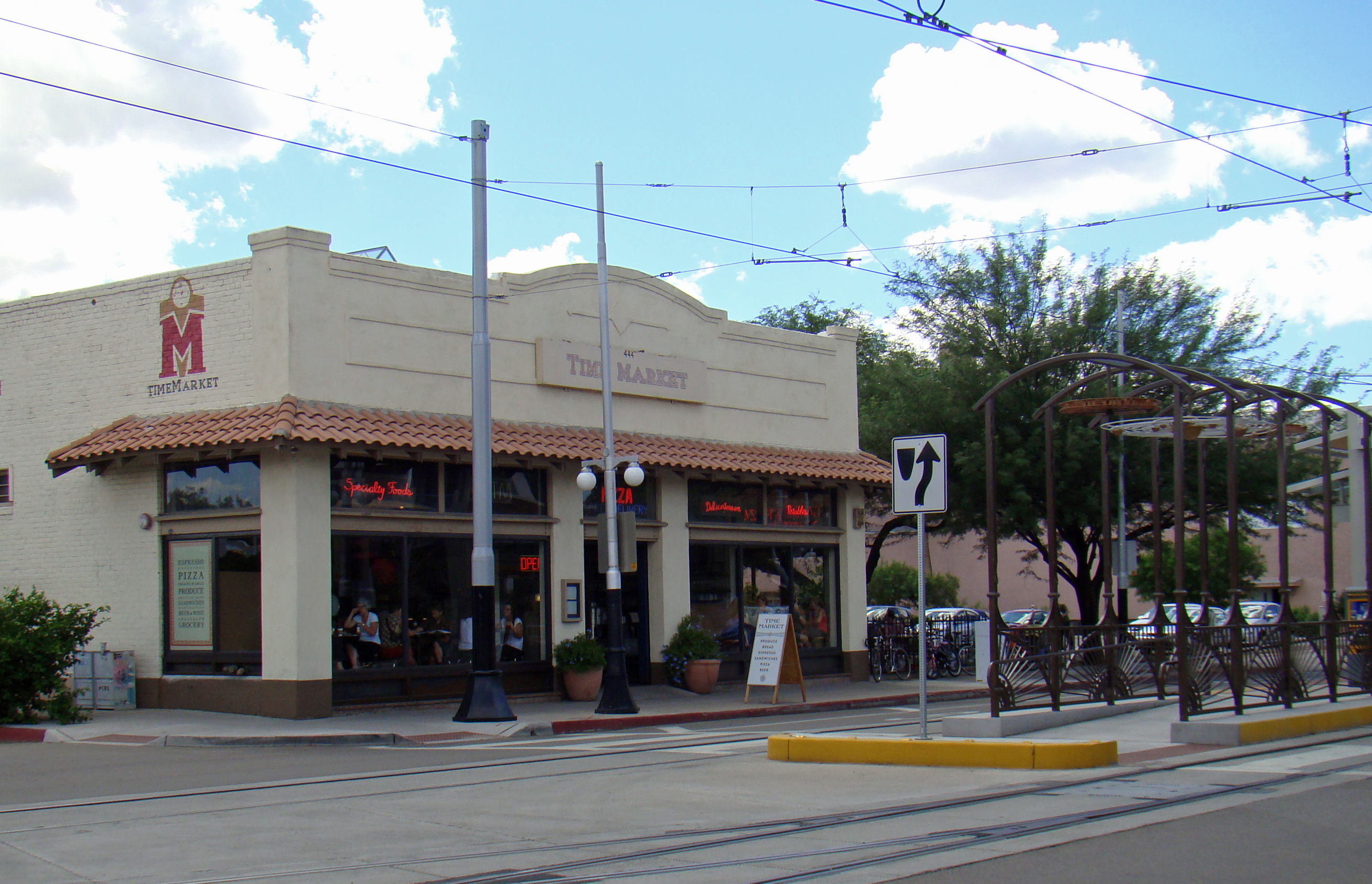
West University Historic District.

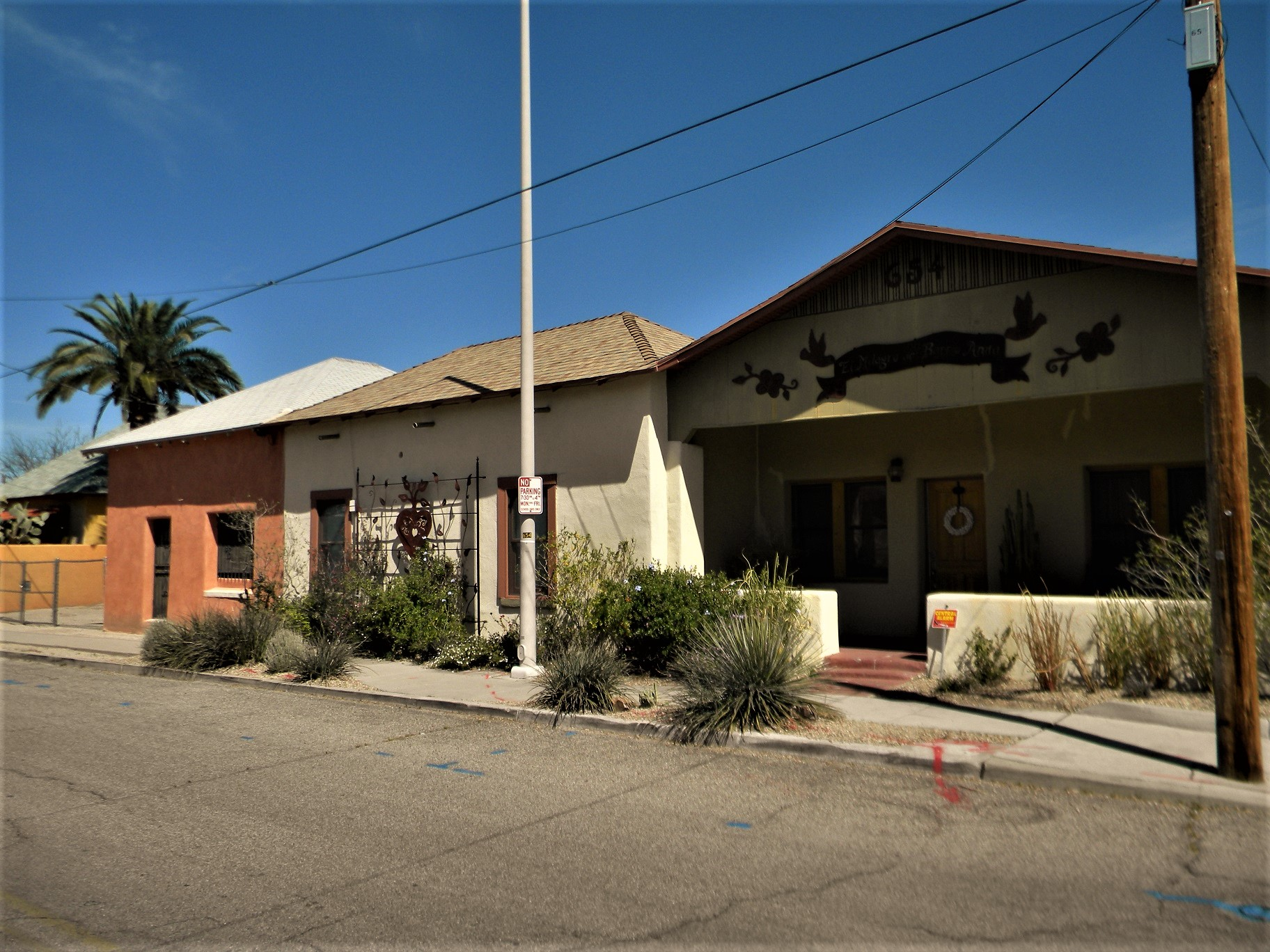
Barrio Anita Historic District.

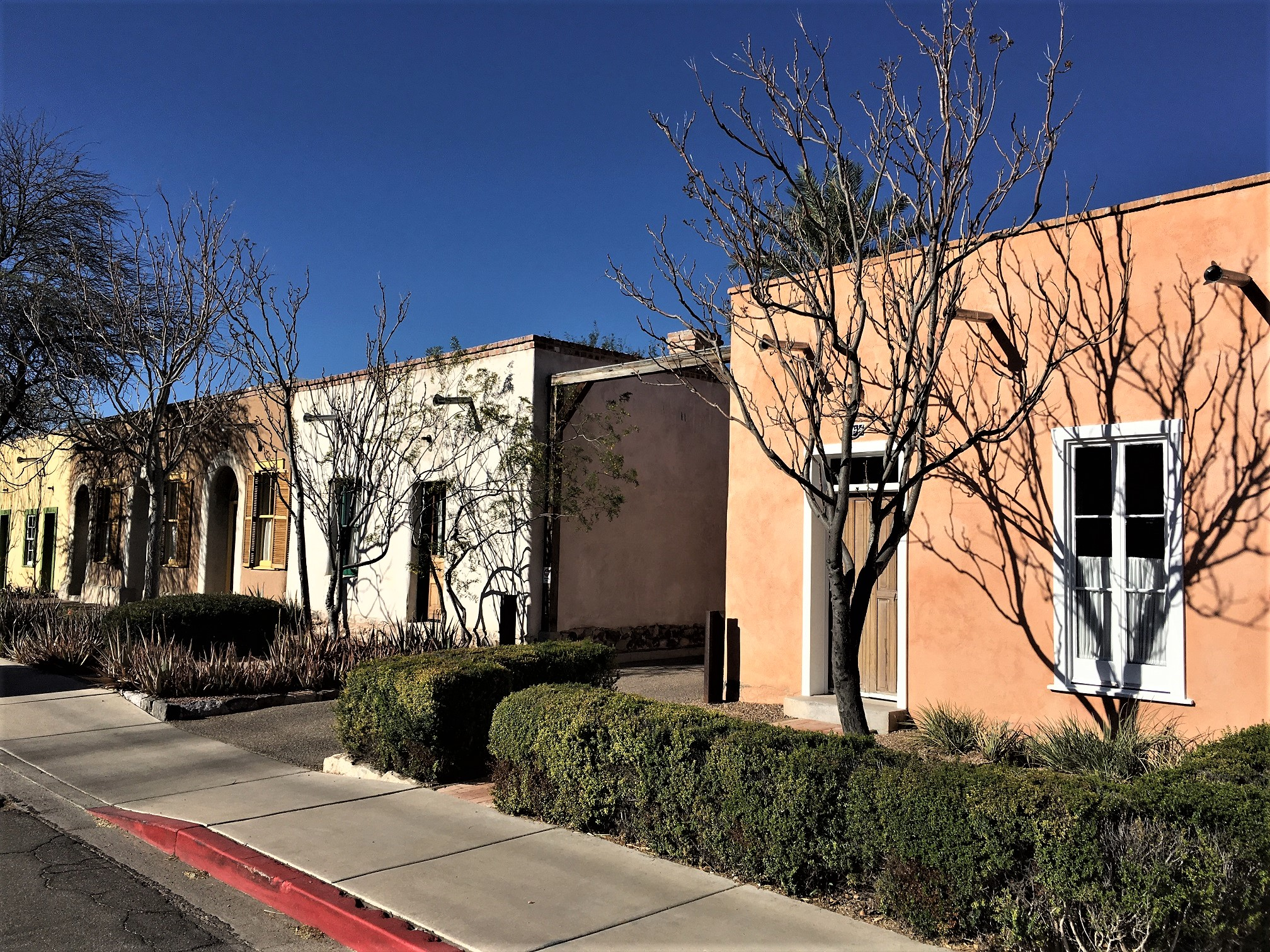
Barrio El Hoyo Historic District.

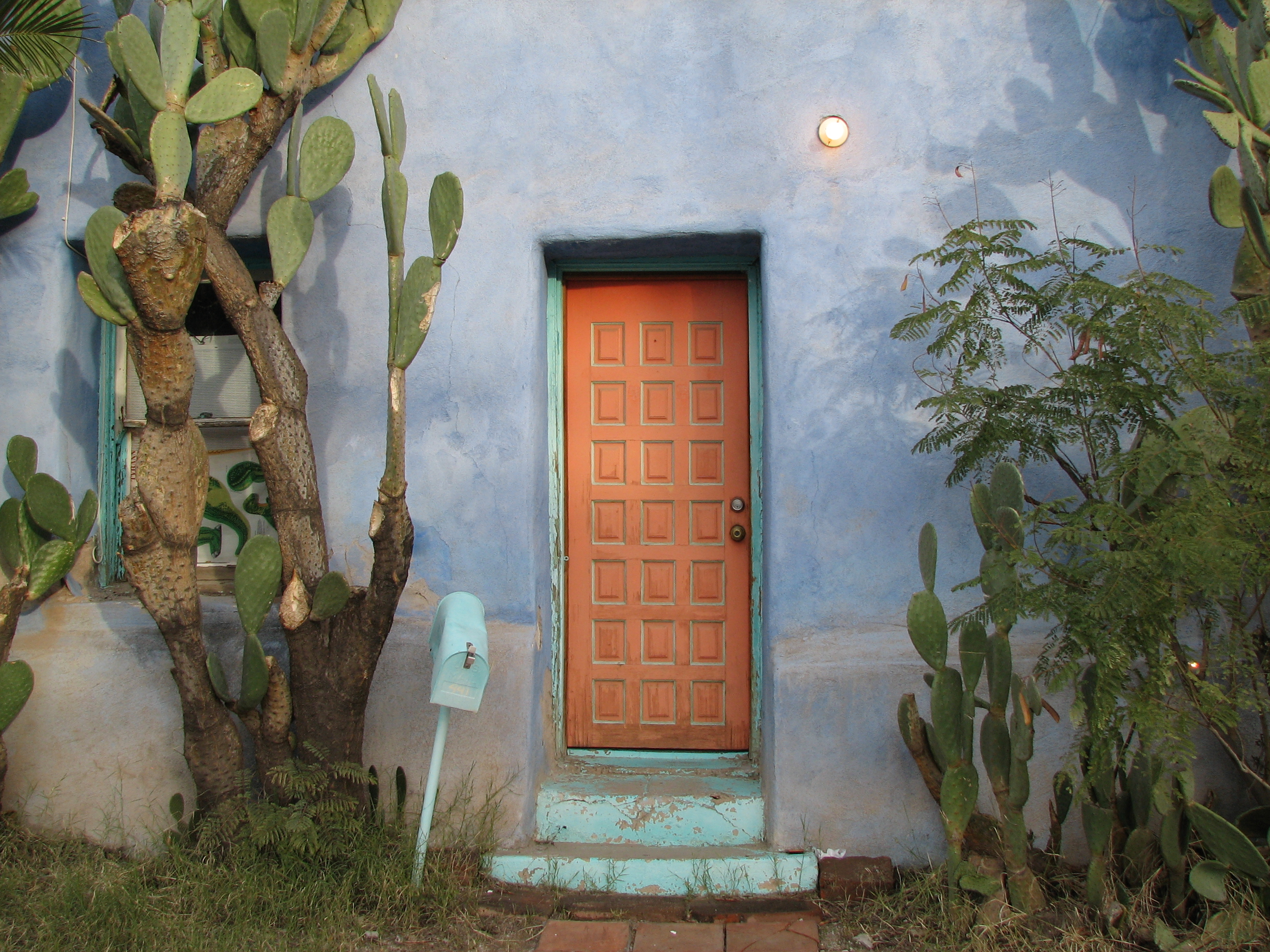
Barrio El Membrillo Historic District.

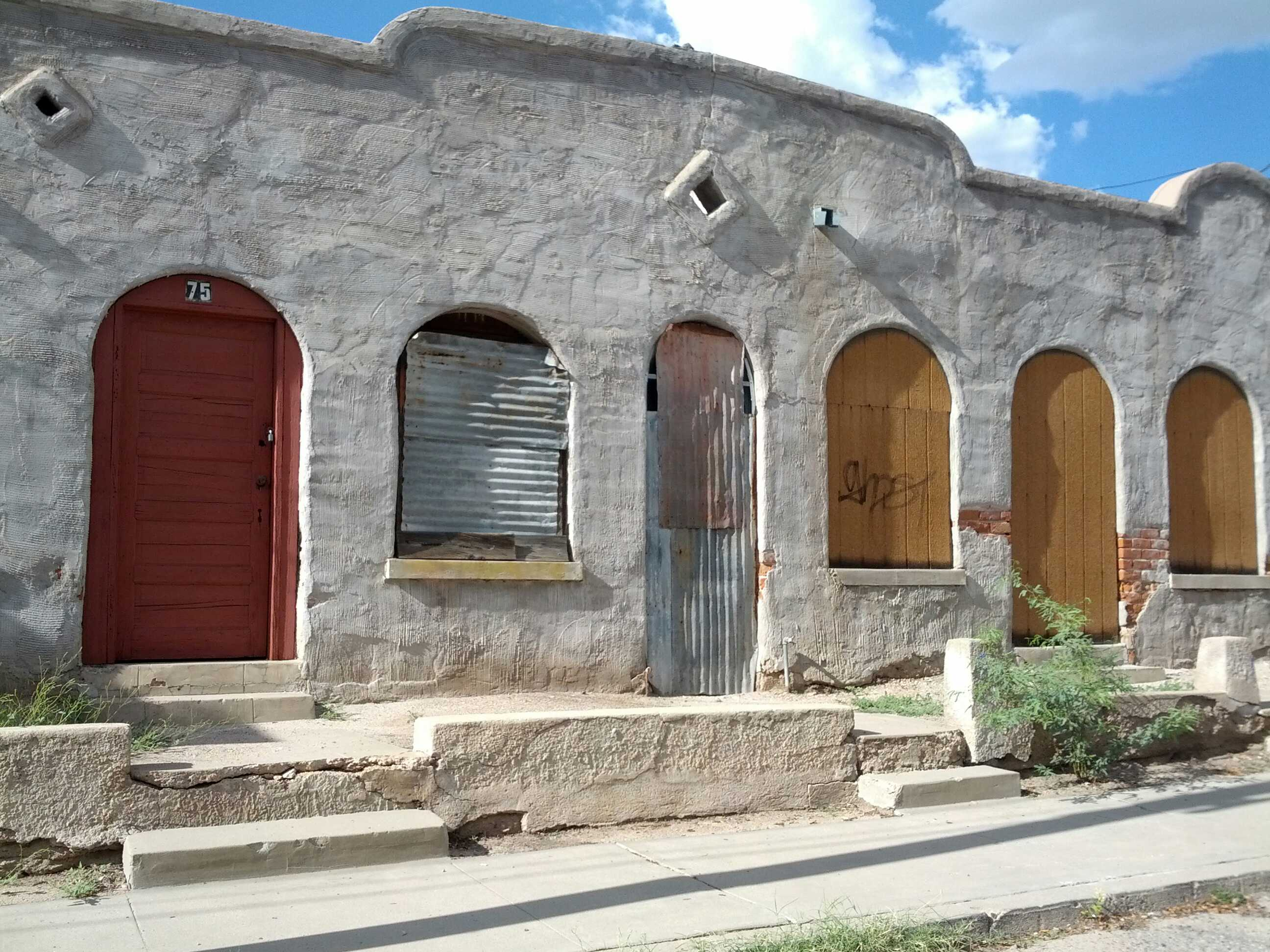
Barrio Libre Historic District.

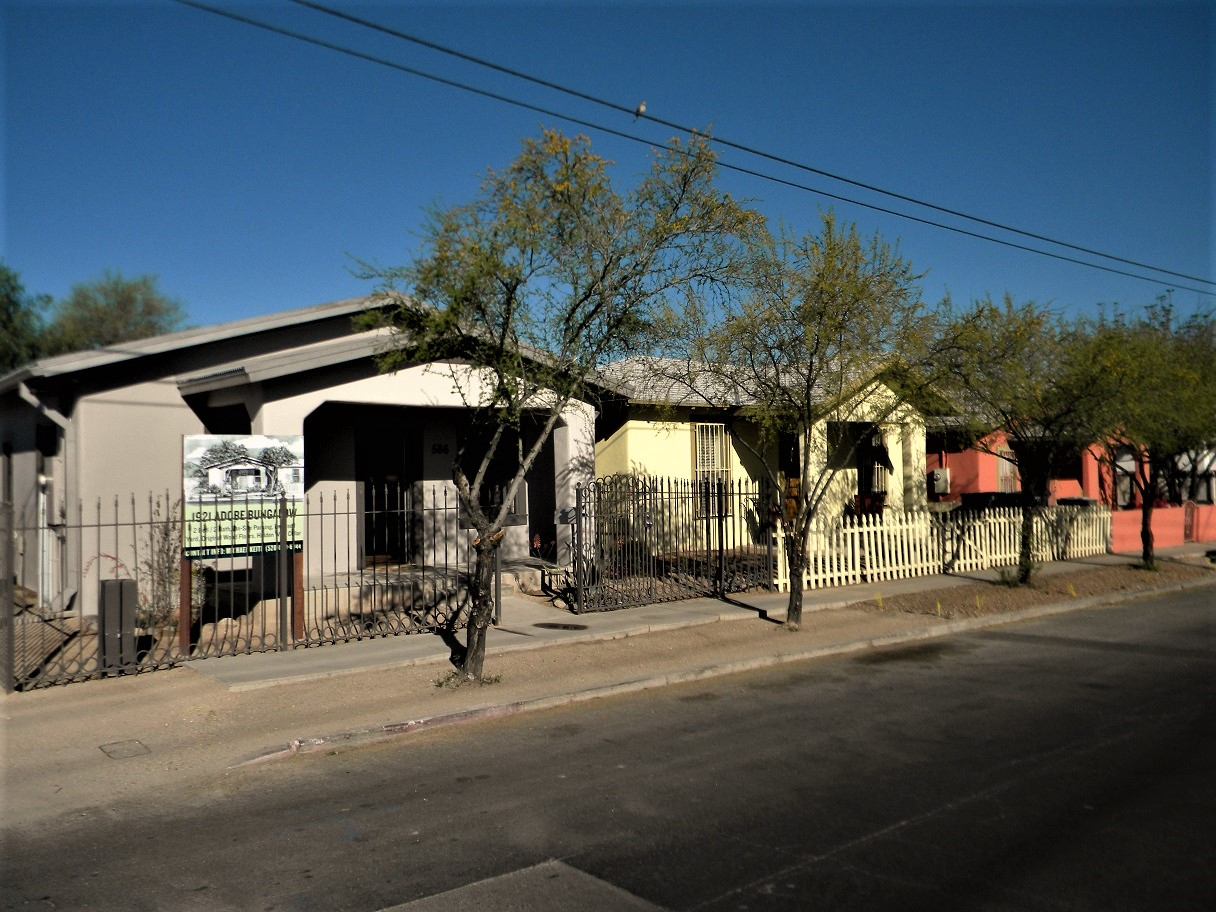
Barrio Santa Rosa Historic District.

The following historic districts are not pictured:

- Aldea Linda Residential Historic District. Location: 4700-5000 blocks of E. Calle Jabali, E. 22nd St., and the 1100 block of S. Swan Rd.; listed in the National Register of Historic Places on June 9, 2009, reference: #09000371.
- Colonia Solana Residential Historic District. Location: Roughly bounded by Broadway Boulevard, S. Randolph Way, Camino Campestre, and S. Country Club.; listed in the National Register of Historic Places on January 4, 1989, reference: #88002963.

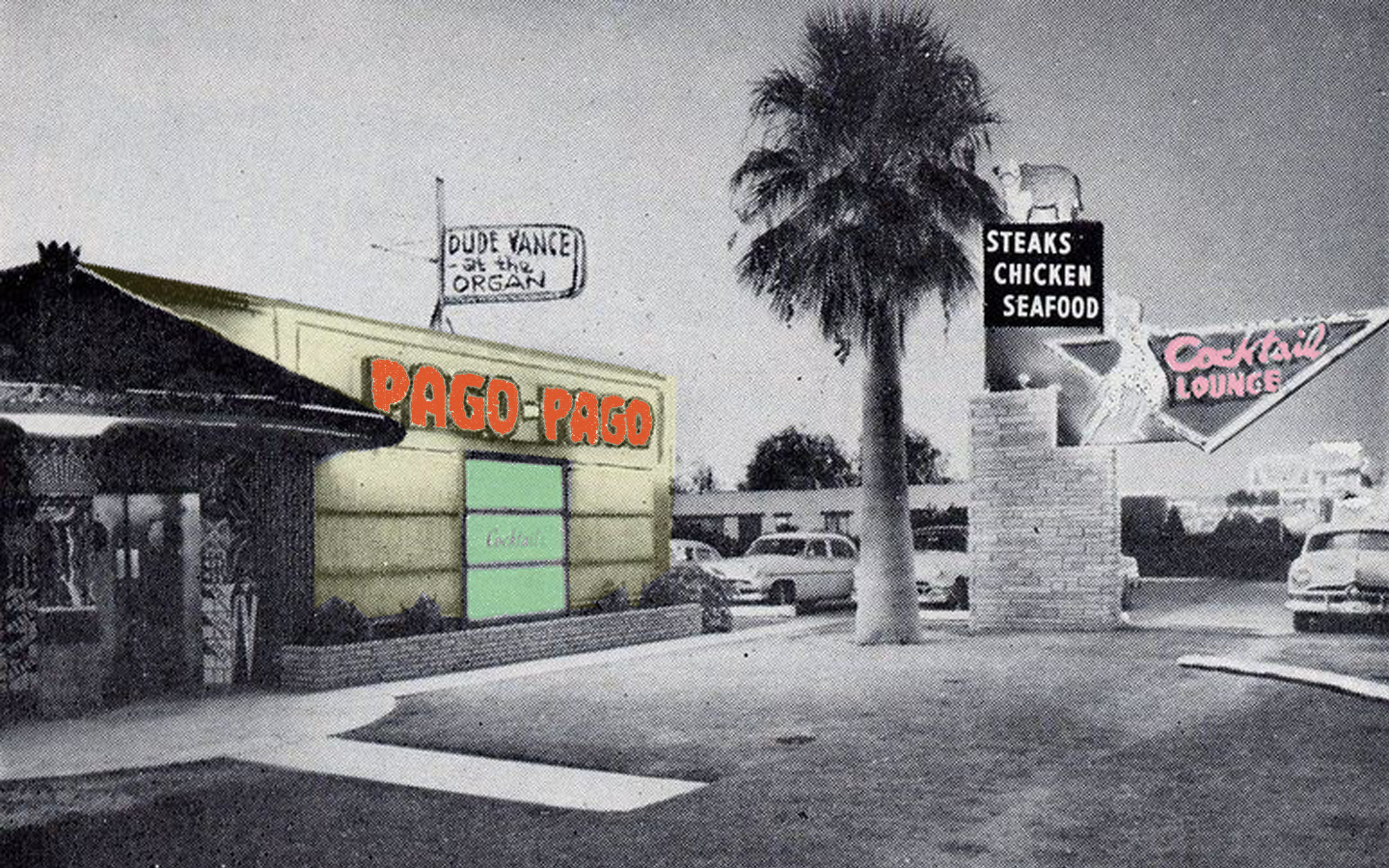
The Pago Pago Restaurant and Lounge in the Miracle Mile Historic District

- The Eleven Arches. Location: 5201 N. Hacienda Del Sol; listed in the National Register of Historic Places on September 9, 2010, reference: #10000740.
- Indian House Community Residential Historic District. Location: Roughly bounded by 5th St., E. Wash, Kane Estates, and Sahura St.; listed in the National Register of Historic Places on October 28, 2001, reference: #01001173.
- Indian Ridge Historic District. Location: Northwest of Sabino Canyon and Tanque Verde; listed in the National Register of Historic Places on July 16, 2010, reference: #10000467.
- Jefferson Park Historic District. Location: Roughly bounded by Euclid, Grant, Campbell & alley south of Lester.; listed in the National Register of Historic Places on May 1, 2012, reference: #12000241.
- Miracle Mile Historic District. Location: Alignment of Miracle Mile, Oracle Road, Drachman Street and Stone Ave.; listed in the National Register of Historic Places December 11, 2017, reference: #100001208.
- San Clemente Historic District. Location: Southeastern corner of the intersection of Alvernon and Broadway; listed in the National Register of Historic Places on February 4, 2005, reference: #04001156.
- Tucson Veterans Administration Hospital Historic District. Location: 3601 S. 6th Ave.; listed in the National Register of Historic Places on August 28, 2012, reference: #12000548.
- Pie Allen Historic District. Location: Roughly bounded by N. Euclid Ave., E. 6th St., N. Park Ave., and E. 10th St.; also 829, 835/837, 841, 841, 843, 903, 905, 907 E. 6th St.; listed in the National Register of Historic Places on June 20, 1996, reference: #96000648. (note: The second set of addresses represent a boundary decrease February 4, 2015.)
- Winterhaven Historic District. Location: Bounded by Prince, Country Club, Ft. Lowell, and Tucson Boulevard; listed in the National Register of Historic Places on December 28, 2005, reference: #05001466.

=== Archaeological Districts and sites ===
The following images are related to two of Archaeological Districts in Tucson. They are:

- The Cocoraque Butte Archaeological District, whose address is restricted. It was listed in the National Register of Historic Places on October 10, 1975, reference: #75000355.
- The Tumamoc Hill Archeological District – located at 1675 W. Anklam Rd./NE corner Greasewood Rd & 22nd Street. It was listed in the National Register of Historic Places on April 5, 2010, reference: #10000109.
Archaeological Districts
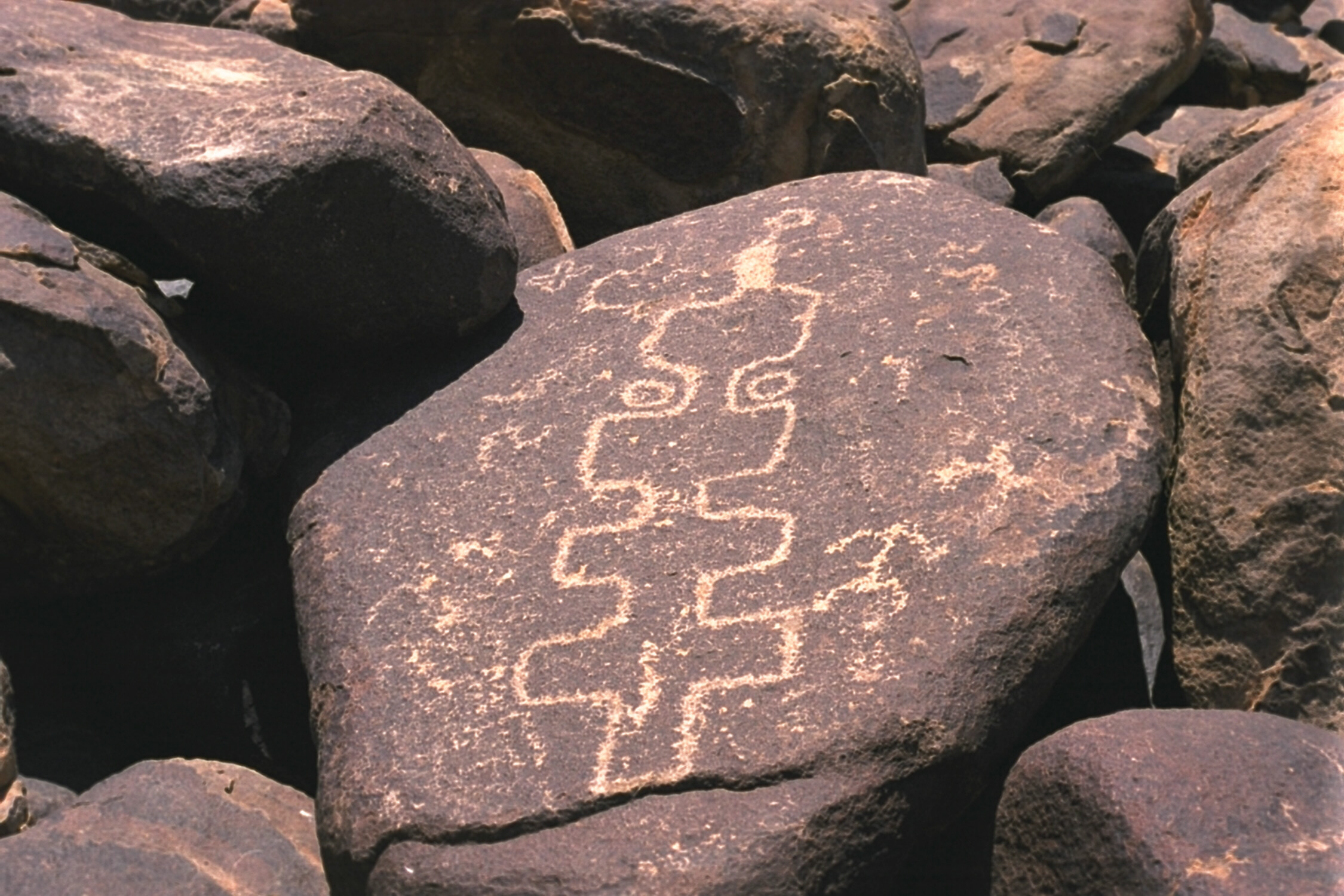
Cocoraque Butte Archaeological District

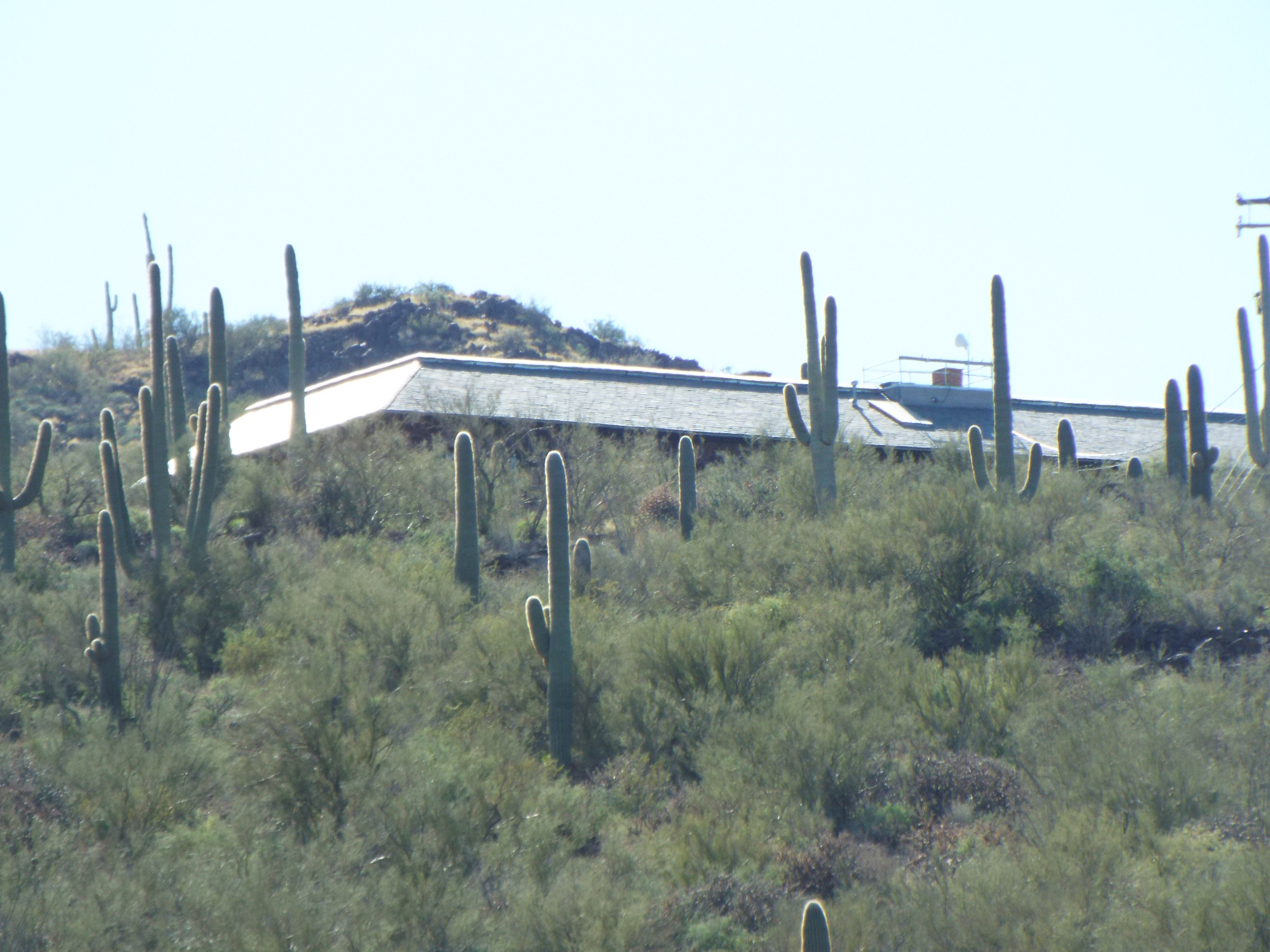
The Tumamoc Hill Archeological District

The other historic Archaeological Districts which are not pictured are the following:

- The Rincon Mountain Foothills Archeological District, whose address is restricted. It was listed in the National Register of Historic Places on October 16, 1979, reference: #79000252.<
- The Sutherland Wash Archeological District, whose address is restricted. It was listed in the National Register of Historic Places on August 15, 1988, reference: #88000228.
- The Sutherland Wash Rock Art District, whose address is restricted. It was listed in the National Register of Historic Places on October 19, 1993, reference: #93001107.
- The University Indian Ruin Archeological Research District – located at 2799 N. Indian Ruins Road. It was listed in the National Register of Historic Places on October 17, 2012, reference: #12000854.
- The Valencia Site (BB:13:15;BB:13:74), whose address is restricted. The site consists of a Hohokam pit house village with accompanying lithic and ceramic artifacts, located on State Trust land. It was listed in the National Register of Historic Places on May 17, 1984, reference: #84000762.
- The Santa Ana del Chiquiburitac Mission – The mission was built in 1881, by the Catholics during the era in which the land a Spanish Territory. The address to the site is restricted. It was listed in the National Register of Historic Places on September 18, 1975, reference: #75000357.

=== Other historic areas ===
- Agua Caliente Ranch Rural Historic Landscape – located at 12325 E. Roger Rd. and listed in the National Register of Historic Places on July 9, 2009, reference: #04001246.
- Binghampton Rural Historic Landscape – located at 12325 E. Roger Rd. and listed in the National Register of Historic Places on May 1, 2003, reference: #03000316.
- Deep Well Ranch – located at 13001 E. Redington Rd. and listed in the National Register of Historic Places on July 9, 2009, reference: #04001072. The Deep Well Ranch is a reputation steer ranch operation on the desert between Florence and Tucson along the eastern foothills of the Picacho Mountains
- Owen Homesite – located at 1415 E. Prince Rd. and listed in the National Register of Historic Places on January 9, 2013, reference: #12001142.
- Rebeil Block – located at 72 E. Congress. and listed in the National Register of Historic Places on March 12, 2004, reference: #03000910.=
- San Rafael Estates – located at Northeast corner of Broadway Boulevard and Wilmont Road and listed in the National Register of Historic Places on July 9, 2009, reference: #12001189.
- Villa Catalina – located at 3000-3034 E. 6th St. and 521-525 N. Country Club Rd. and listed in the National Register of Historic Places on December 22, 2009, reference: #09001114.
- Harold Bell Wright Estate – located at 850 N. Barbara Worth and listed in the National Register of Historic Places on January 18, 1985, reference: #85000081.
- Harold Bell Wright Estates – located at Roughly bounded by N. Wilmot Rd. on the west, E. Speedway Blvd. on north, El Dorado Hills subdivision on the east. The land was developed in 1950, on the estate which once belonged to author Harold Bell Wright. The estates were listed in the National Register of Historic Places on July 9, 2009, reference: #12001189.
Other historic areas
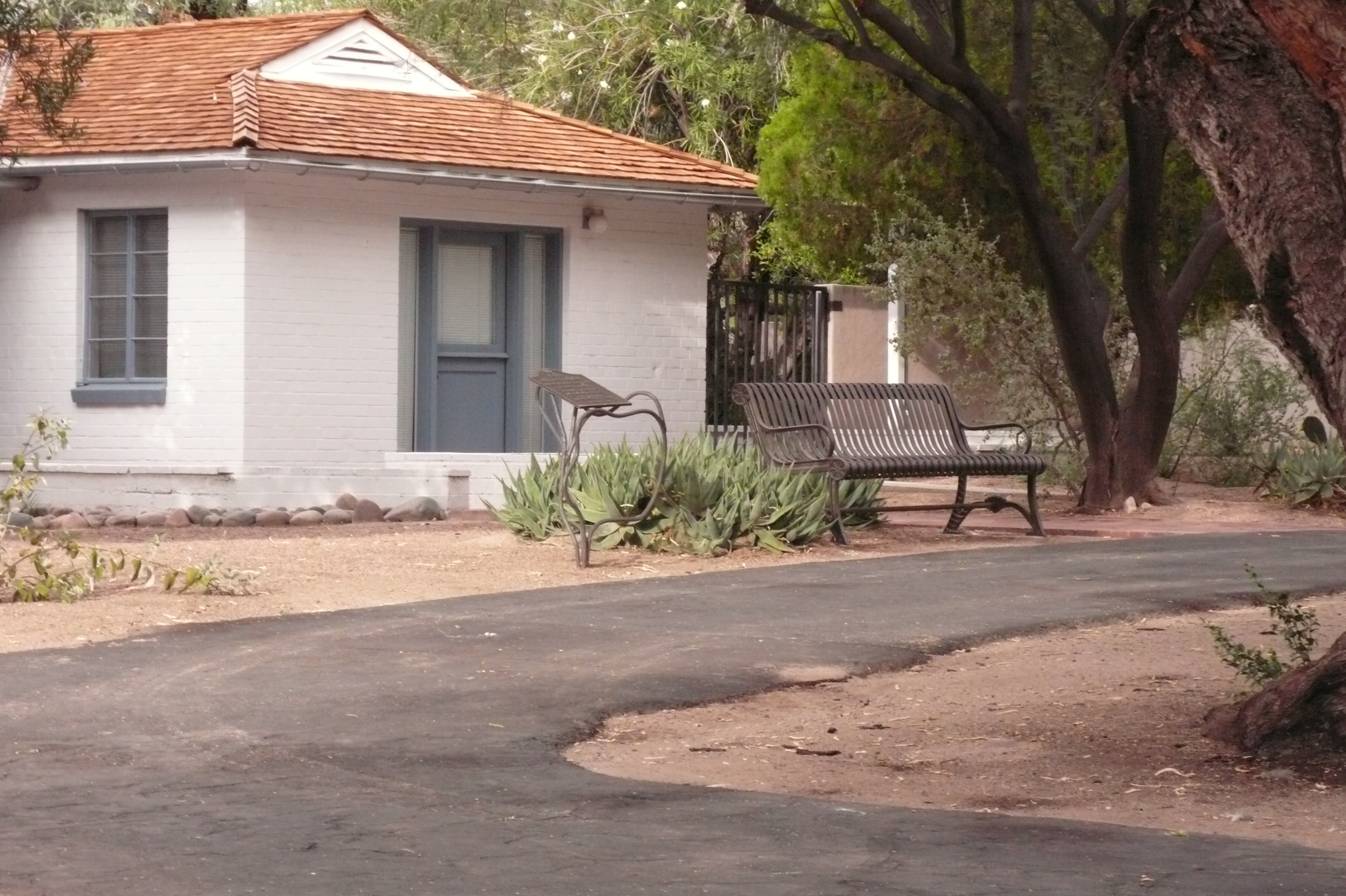
Agua Caliente Ranch Rural Historic Landscape.

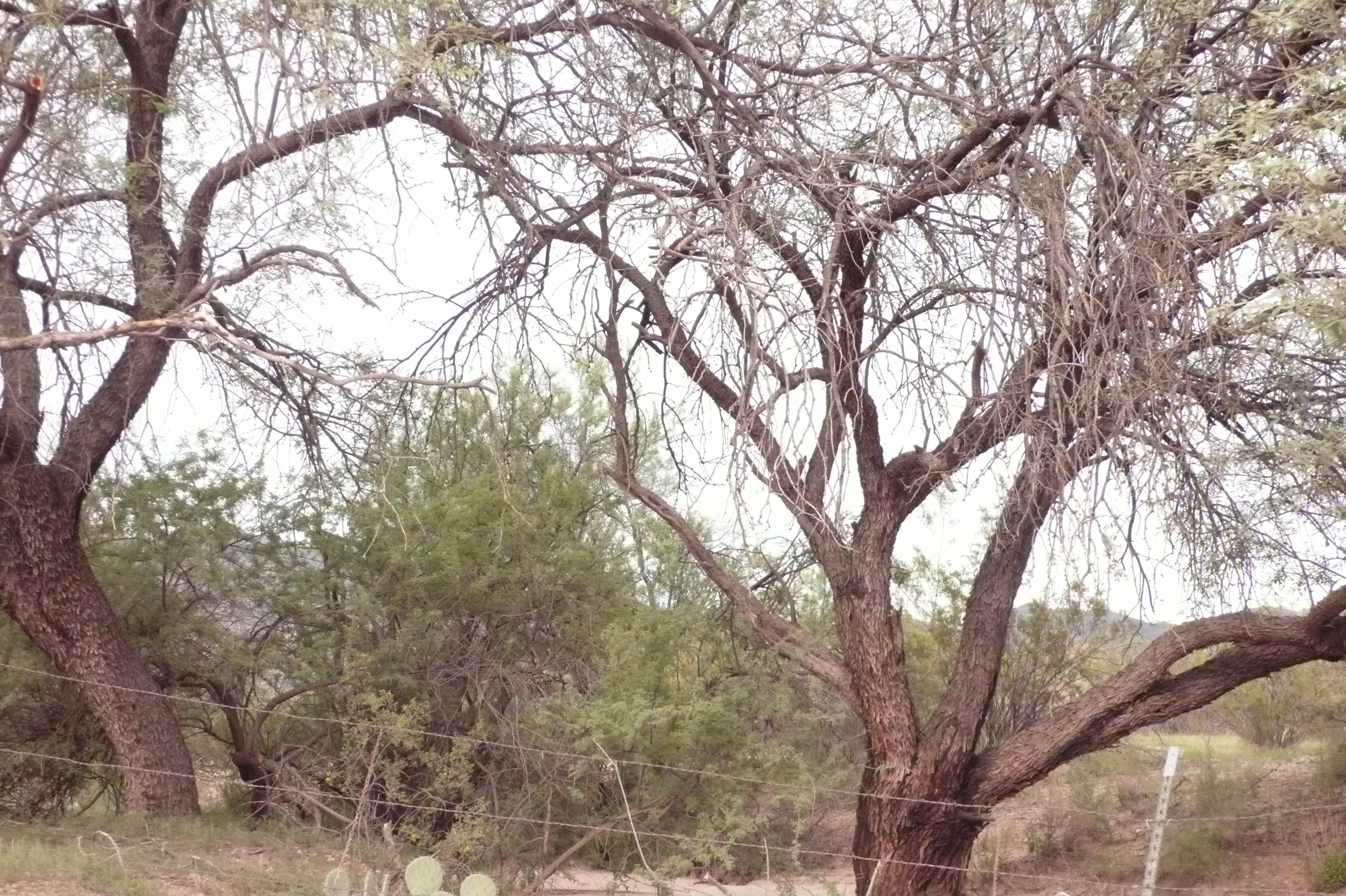
The Deep Well Ranch wash.

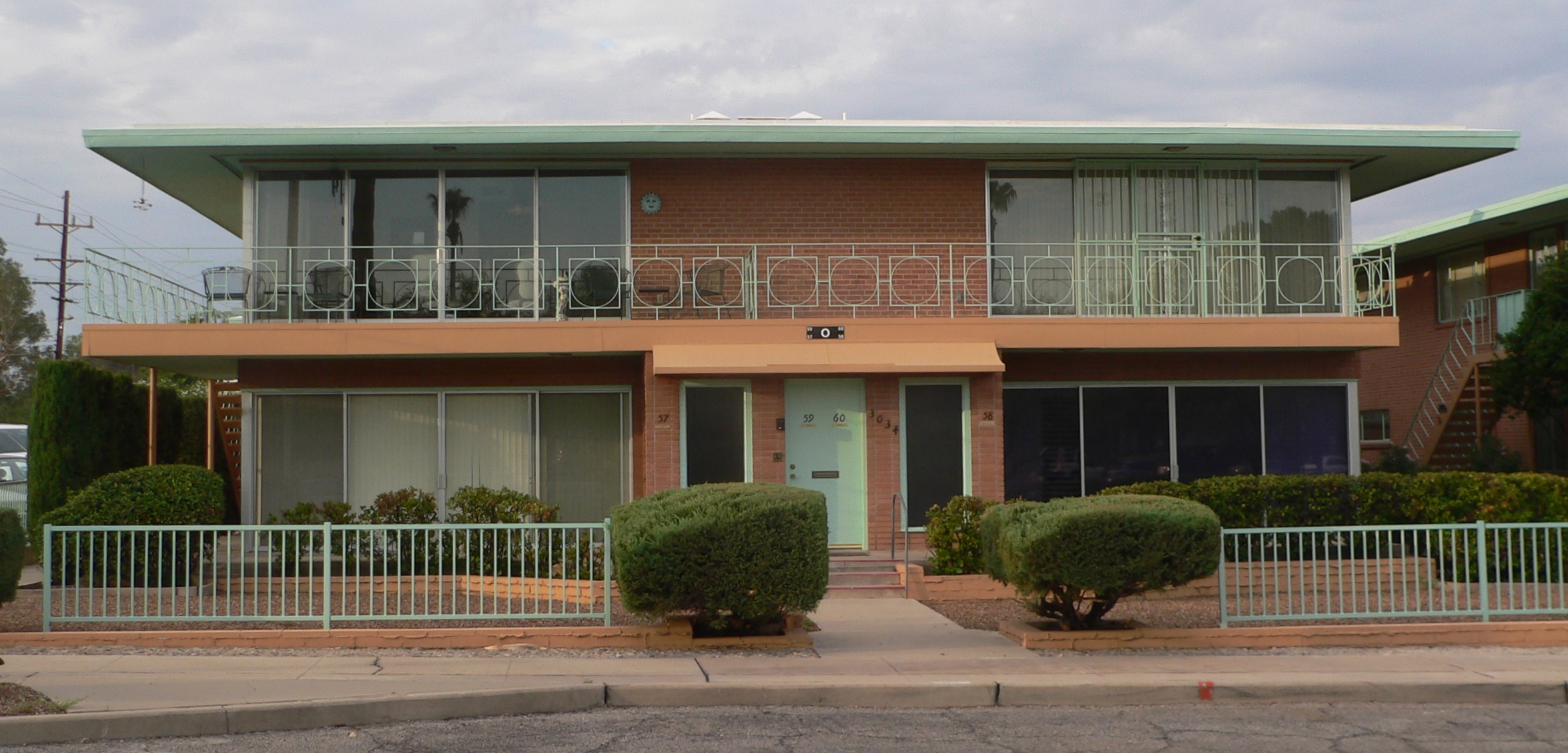
Villa Catalina apartments.

=== Buildings ===
The following is a brief description of some of the pictured buildings which are listed in the National Register of Historic Places:

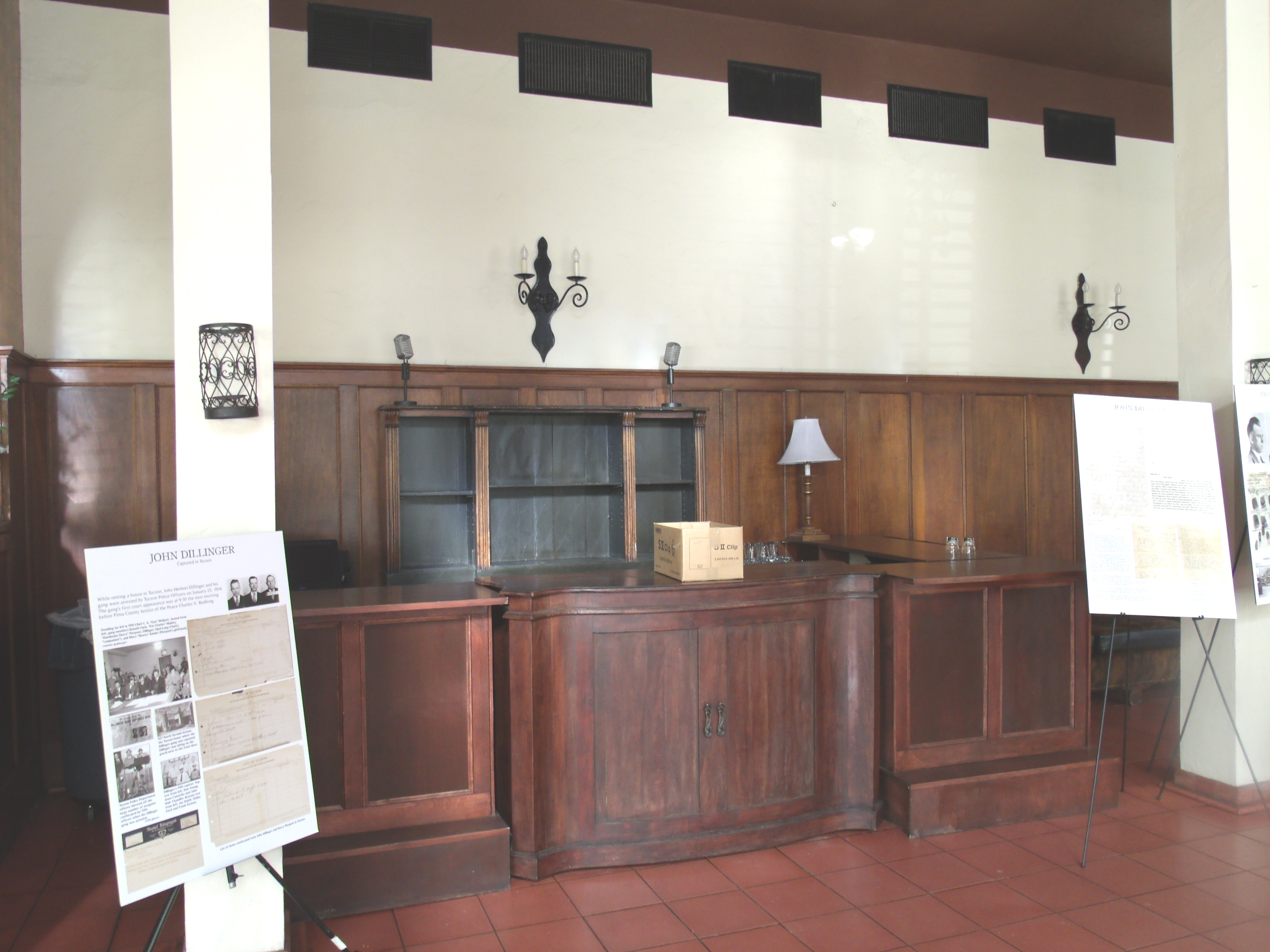
The old lobby of the Hotel Congress.

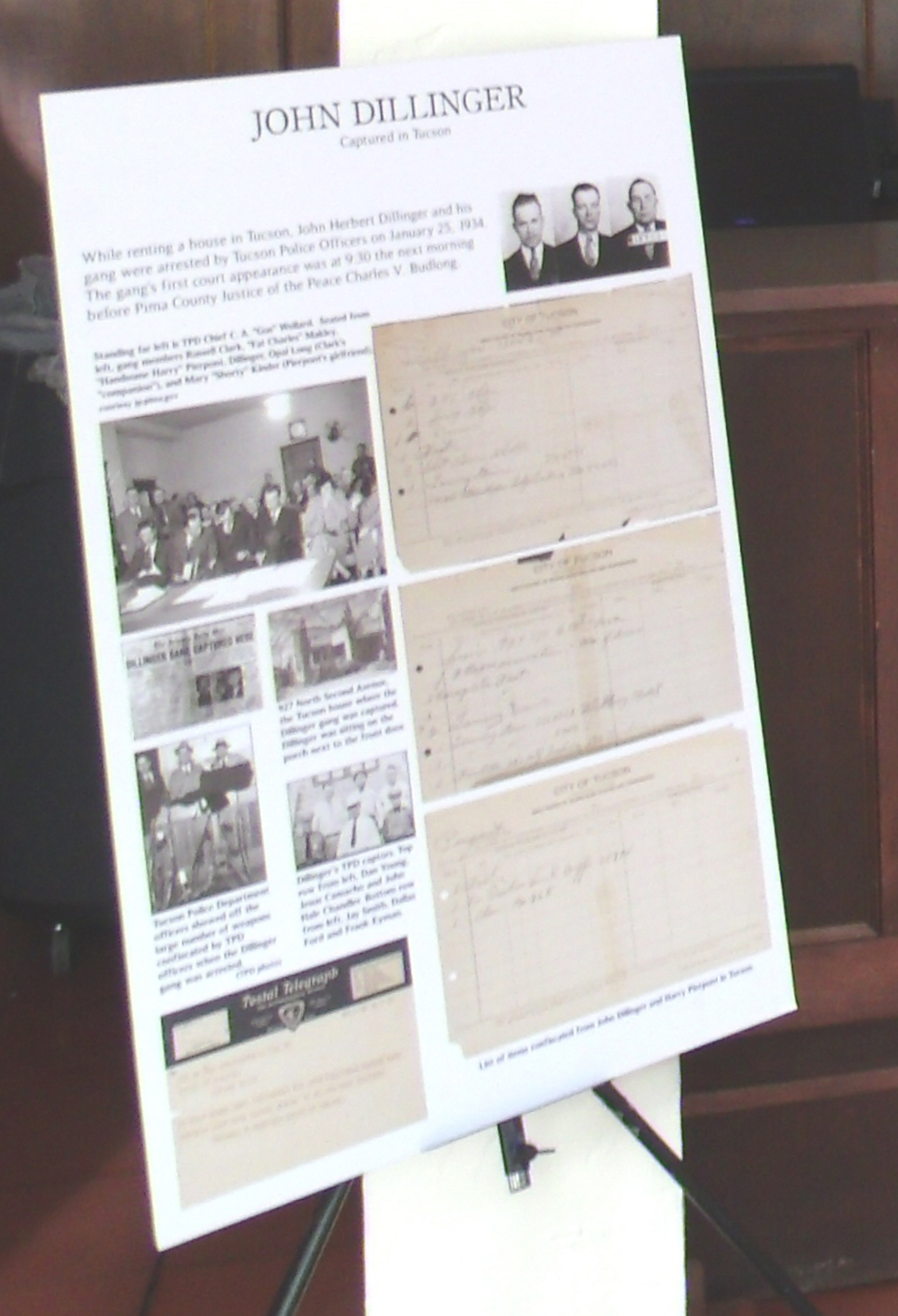
Display of newspaper clippings related to the capture of John Dillinger and his gang.

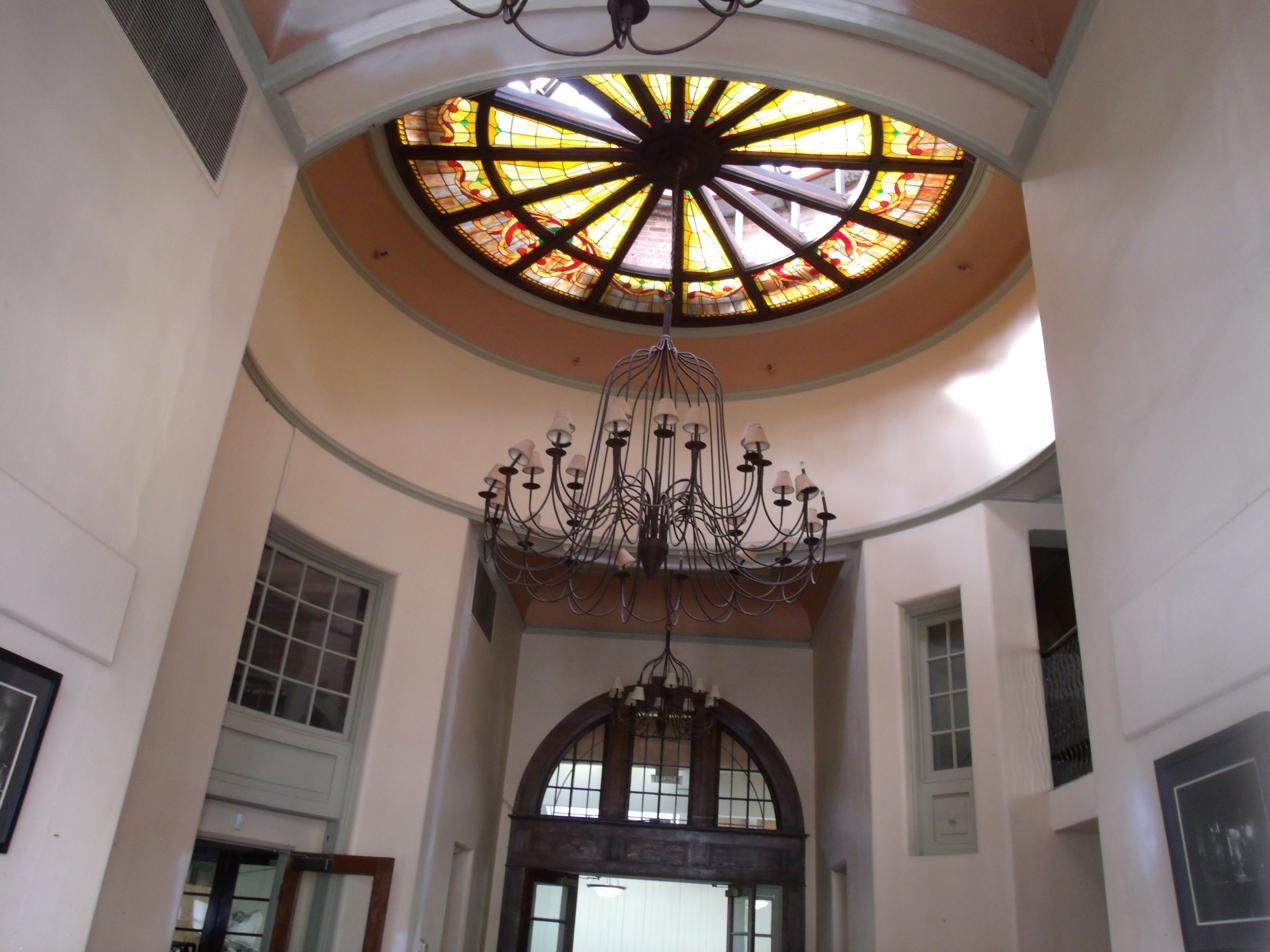
Inside the El Paso and South Western Railroad Depot

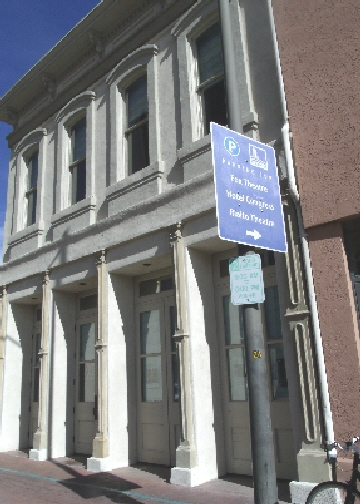
Arizona Daily Star Building

- The MacArthur Building – built in 1907 and located at 345 E. Toole Avenue. The three-story building was originally named the Hotel Heidel. In 1944, it was renamed MacArthur Hotel. The hotel was built to serve passengers arriving via the Southern Pacific Railroad Depot. The hotel closed in 1979 and was renovated for office use in 1985.
- El Paso and South Western Railroad Depot – built in 1912 and completed in 1913. It is located at 419 W. Congress St.. It was listed in the National Register of Historic Places in 2004, ref.: #03000903.
- The Rialto Building and Rialto Theater – both were built in 1917 and are located at 300-320 E. Congress St.. (The Rialto Theater in 318 E. Congress St.). The first full-length film to play on the Rialto's screen was The Toll Gate, on August 29, 1920. The Rialto had vaudeville shows every Wednesday, one of its performers was Ginger Rogers. A star was added to the door of the dressing room to which Rogers had been relegated. Both structures were listed in the National Register of Historic Places in 2003, the building complex ref.: 03000908 and theater ref.: 03000909.
- The J. C. Penney–Chicago Store Building = was built in 1903 and is located in 130 E. Congress St.. J.C. Penney, was the building's longest single tenant, occupying the building from 1927 to 1957. The El Paso-based department store occupied the building until 1967 when it closed. The Chicago Store moved in after the El Paso store closed. The building was gutted of its original interiors in 2019. The building was listed in the National Register of Historic Places in 2003, ref.: #03000907.
- The Hittinger Block – was built in 1901 and is located in 120 E. Congress St.. It was built by Anton Hittinger, a prominent Tucson mercantile and housed Drachman's Shoe Company. Currently as of 2022 houses HEB mgmt and Batch. The building was listed in the National Register of Historic Places in 2003, ref.: #03000904.
- The Fox Commercial Building – was built in 1925 and is located at 27 W. Congress St. It was listed in the National Register of Historic Places in 2004, ref.: #04000258.
- The Fox Tucson Theatre – was built in 1925 and is located at 1 W. Congress St. The "Fox Tucson Theatre", as it is also known, opened on April 11, 1930, as a dual vaudeville/movie house. It was listed in the National Register of Historic Places in 2003, ref.: #03000905.
- The Old Pima County Court – was built in 1925 and is located in 115 N. Church Ave. Its mosaic dome is one of the Old Pueblo's most recognizable structures. It was listed in the National Register of Historic Places in 1978, ref.: #78000566.
- The Arizona Daily Star Building – was built in 1875 and is located at 30 N Church Ave. The National Register of Historic Places added the building to its list in 2002, ref.: #02000033. The NRHP stated that the period of significance was from 1875 to 1924.
- The Amtrak Station – was built in three stages (1907, 1910, 1922) and is located at 400 N. Toole Ave., It was listed in the National Register of Historic Places on October 15, 1999, under the name of "Tucson Warehouse Historic District", ref.: #97000886.
- The Ronstadt House – was built in 1904 and is located at 607 North 6th Avenue. Frederick Ronstadt served a two-year term on the Pima County Board of Supervisors, was chairman of the Water and Agricultural Committee of the Tucson Chamber of Commerce. The house was listed in the National Register of Historic Places in 1979, ref.: #79000423.
- The Old Main, University of Arizona – also known as the University of Arizona School of Agriculture, was built in 1875 and is located in the University of Arizona campus of Tucson. It was added to the National Register of Historic Places in 1972, ref. : #72000199.
- The Arizona Hotel – located at 31-47 N. 6th Ave., 135 E. 10th St. Listed in the National Register of Historic Places on September 12, 2003, reference: #03000902.
- The Arizona Inn – located at 2200 E. Elm St. It was built by Isabella Greenway, who became Arizona's first female representative to the U.S. Congress in 1932. Listed in the National Register of Historic Places on May 5, 1988, reference: #88000240.
- The Copper Bell Bed and Breakfast – located at 25 N. Westmoreland Ave. The main construction material used to build is volcanic rock, excavated from a nearby quarry in "A" Mountain (also known as Sentinel Peak). The old copper bell was brought from a German church. It was listed in the National Register of Historic Places on March 30, 1992, reference: #92000254.
- The Coronado Hotel – located at 410 E. 9th St. Originally built by Harold M. Brooks, an English immigrant, the building was sold in 2010 and has been completely reworked to bring 30 modern micro-unit apartments. Listed in the National Register of Historic Places on November 30, 1982, reference: #82001622.
- The Desert Laboratory – located at West of Tucson off W. Anklam Rd. on Tumamoc Hill. The laboratory was founded by the Carnegie Institution to study how plants survive and thrive in the heat and aridity of deserts. It was listed in the National Register of Historic Places on October 15, 1966, reference: #66000190.
- The Don Martin Apartment House – located at 605 E. 9th St. Listed in the National Register of Historic Places on September 9, 2010, reference: #10000748.
- The El Encanto Apartments – built in the 1940s to house officers at what now is Davis-Monthan Air Force Base is located at 2820 E. 6th Street. It was listed in the National Register of Historic Places on December 30, 1994, reference: #94001181.
- The Haynes Building – located at 312-314 E. Sixth St. Listed in the National Register of Historic Places on September 9, 2010, reference: #10000743.
- The Julian-Drew Building – built in 1917 and located at 182 E. Broadway. W.A.Julian ran his own plumbing business with offices and a storage yard on-site. Tucson Overland Company, an automobile dealership, and the principal tenant, occupied the majority of the first floor. Listed in the National Register of Historic Places on March 29, 1996, reference: #96000306.
- The Lemmon Rock Lookout House – built in 1928 and located in the Coronado National Forest. Listed in the National Register of Historic Places on January 28, 1988, reference: #87002465.
- The Bear Down Gym – built in 1926 and located at E. 4th St., in the University of Arizona campus. The gym was originally known as "Men's Gymnasium". Listed in the National Register of Historic Places on October 4, 1990, reference: #900001526.
- The Old Library Building. – located at the University of Arizona campus. Listed in the National Register of Historic Places on November 28, 1979, reference: #79000422.
- The Ronstadt-Sims Adobe Warehouse – located at 911 N. 13th Ave. Listed in the National Register of Historic Places on May 11, 1989, reference: #88002133.
- The U.S. Post Office and Courthouse – built in 1928 and located at 55 E. Broadway. The building, which is now known as the "James A. Walsh United States Courthouse", was listed in the National Register of Historic Places on February 10, 1983, reference: #83002995.
- The University Heights Elementary School – built in 1917 and located at 1201 N. Park Ave. Listed in the National Register of Historic Places on October 6, 1983, reference: #83003494.
- The USDA Tucson Plant Materials Center. The center was established in 1934 and is located at 3241 N. Romero Rd. The primary mission of the Tucson Plant Materials Center (AZPMC) was the production of nursery stock and the collection of large quantities of seeds for use on the Navajo, Gila, and Rio Grande regional projects. Listed in the National Register of Historic Places on July 2, 1997, reference: #97000592.
- The Valley National Bank Building – built in 1929 is located at 27 S. Stone Ave. It is the oldest skyscraper in Tucson. The building was listed in the National Register of Historic Places on September 12, 2003, reference: #03000911.
- Carrillo Elementary School – built in 1930 and located at 440 South Main Avenue where the old Elysian Grove was once located.The Carrillo School construction contract went to R. H. Martin on February 15, 1930, on a low bid of $72,114.20. Architect was M. H. Starkweather. The original construction was a 12-classroom building.
Historic buildings
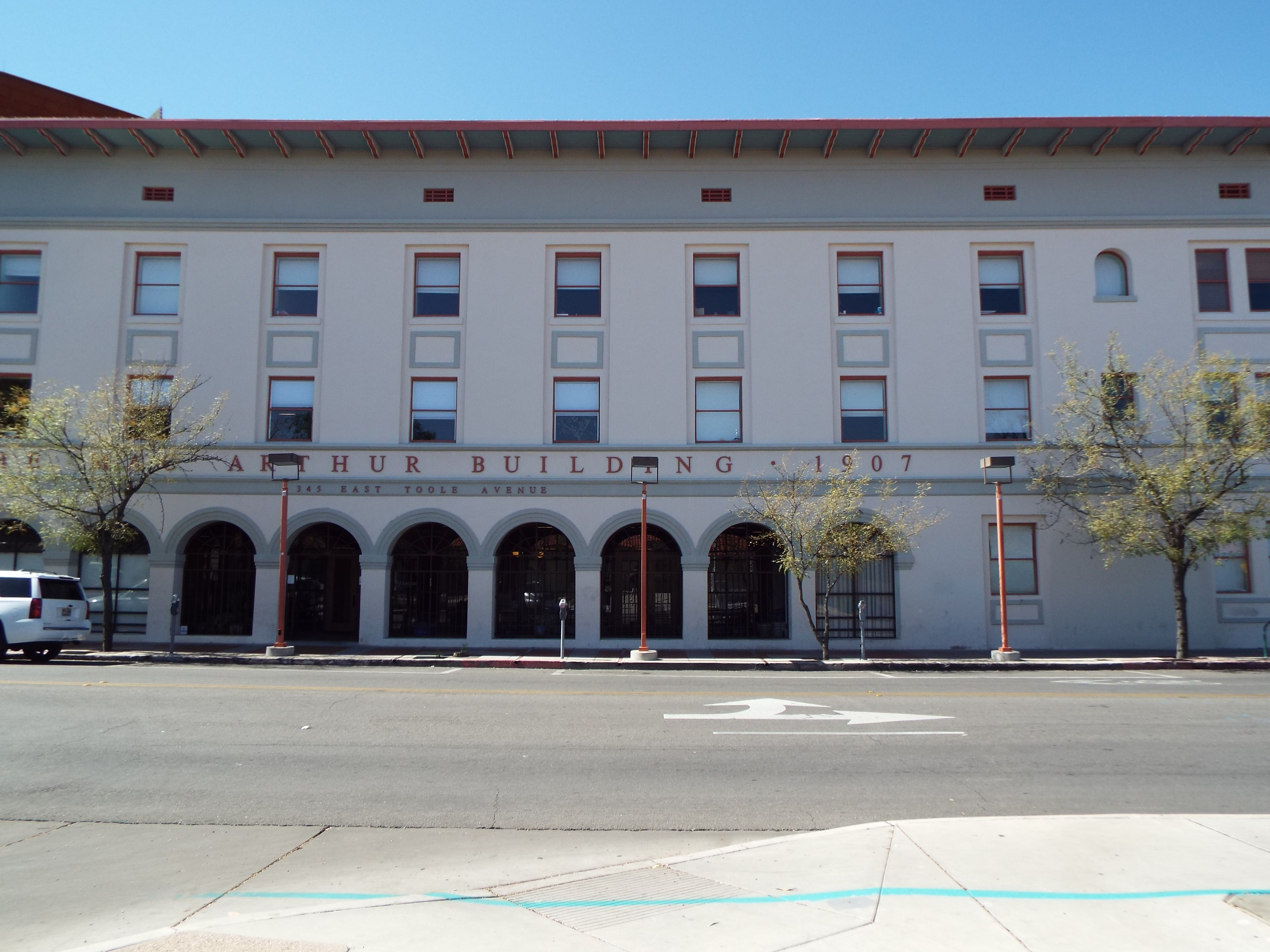
The MacArthur Building

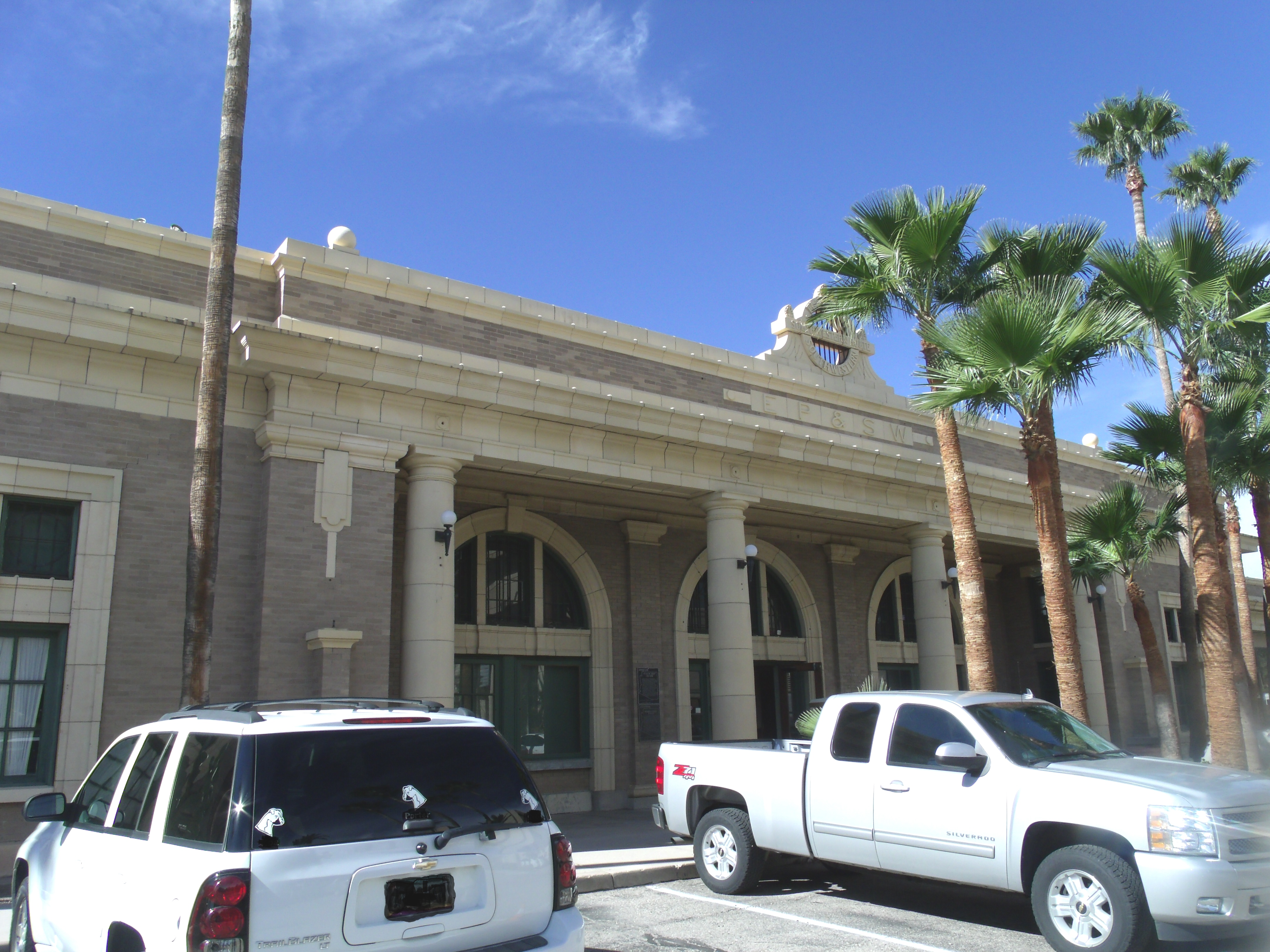
El Paso and South Western Railroad Depot

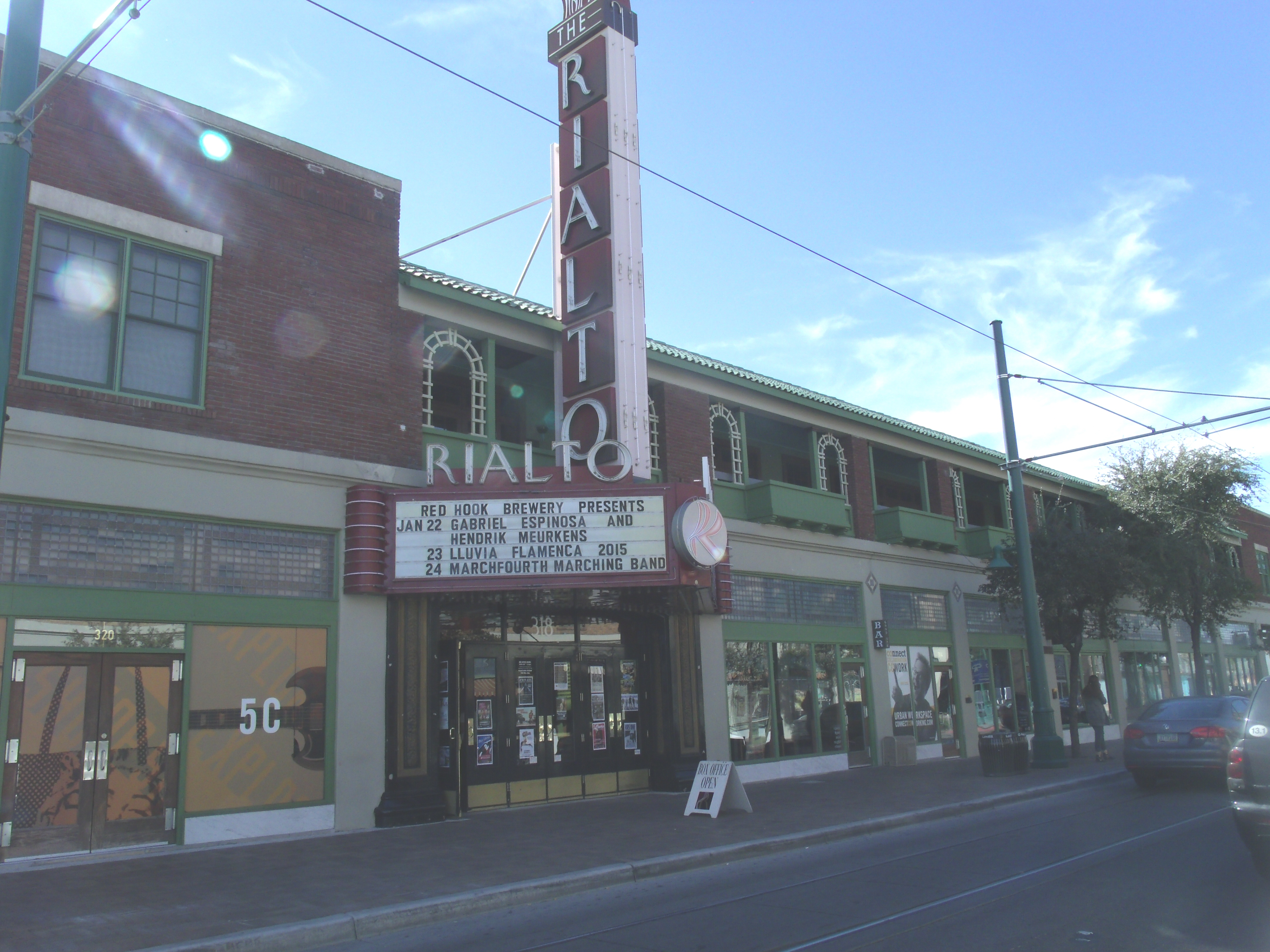
Both the Rialto Building and Rialto Theater.

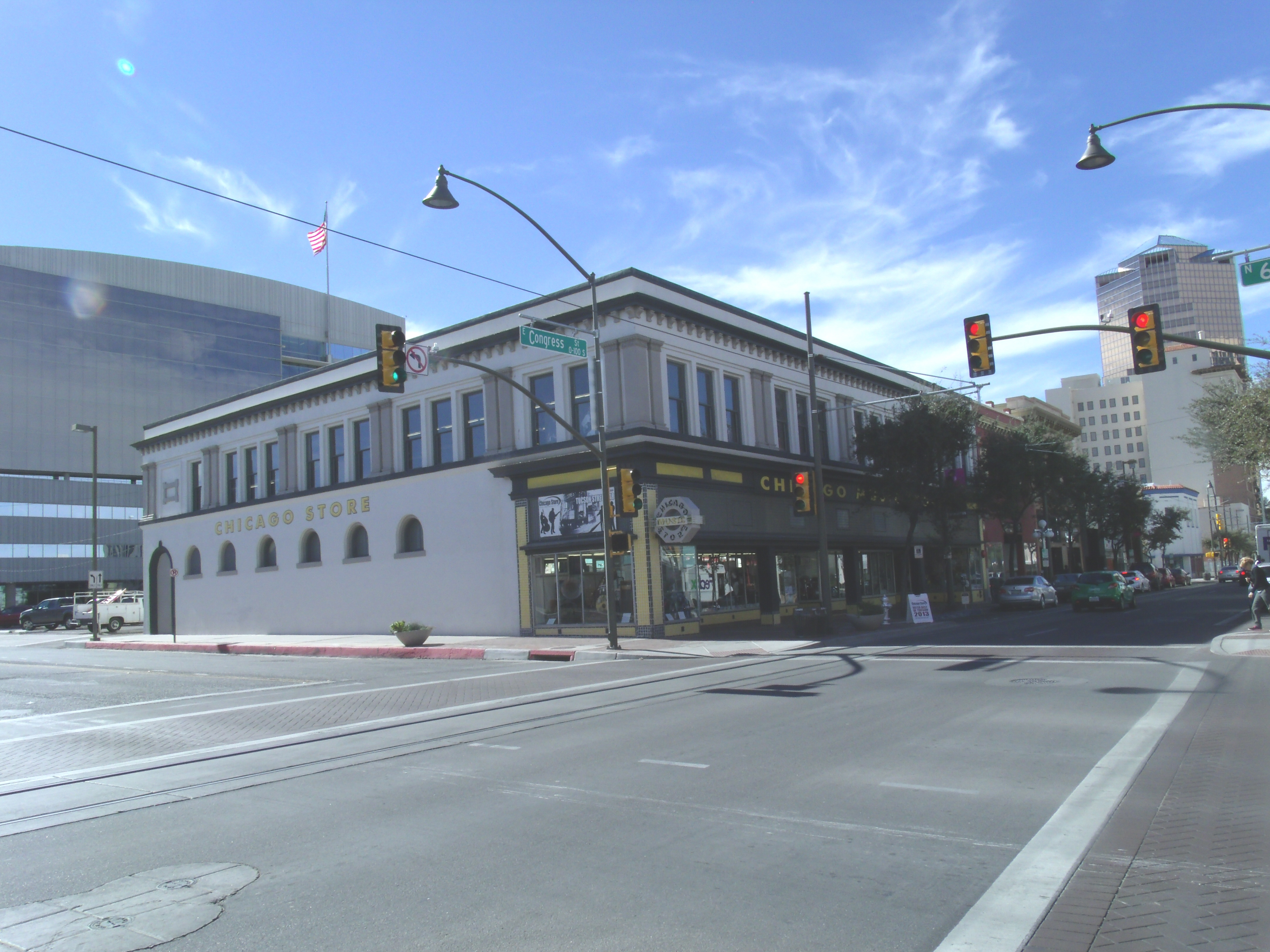
The J. C. Penney–Chicago Store Building.

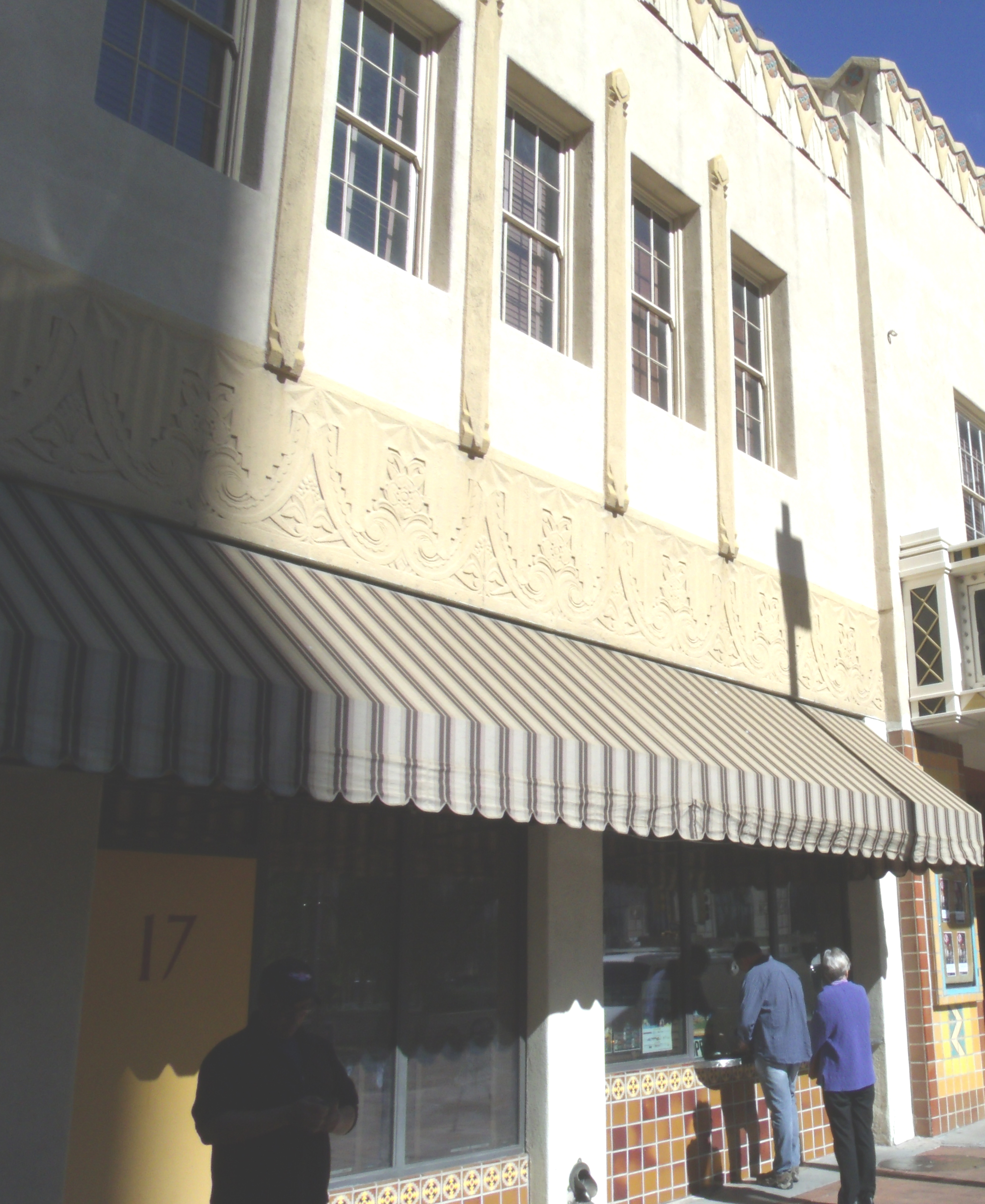
The Fox Commercial Building.

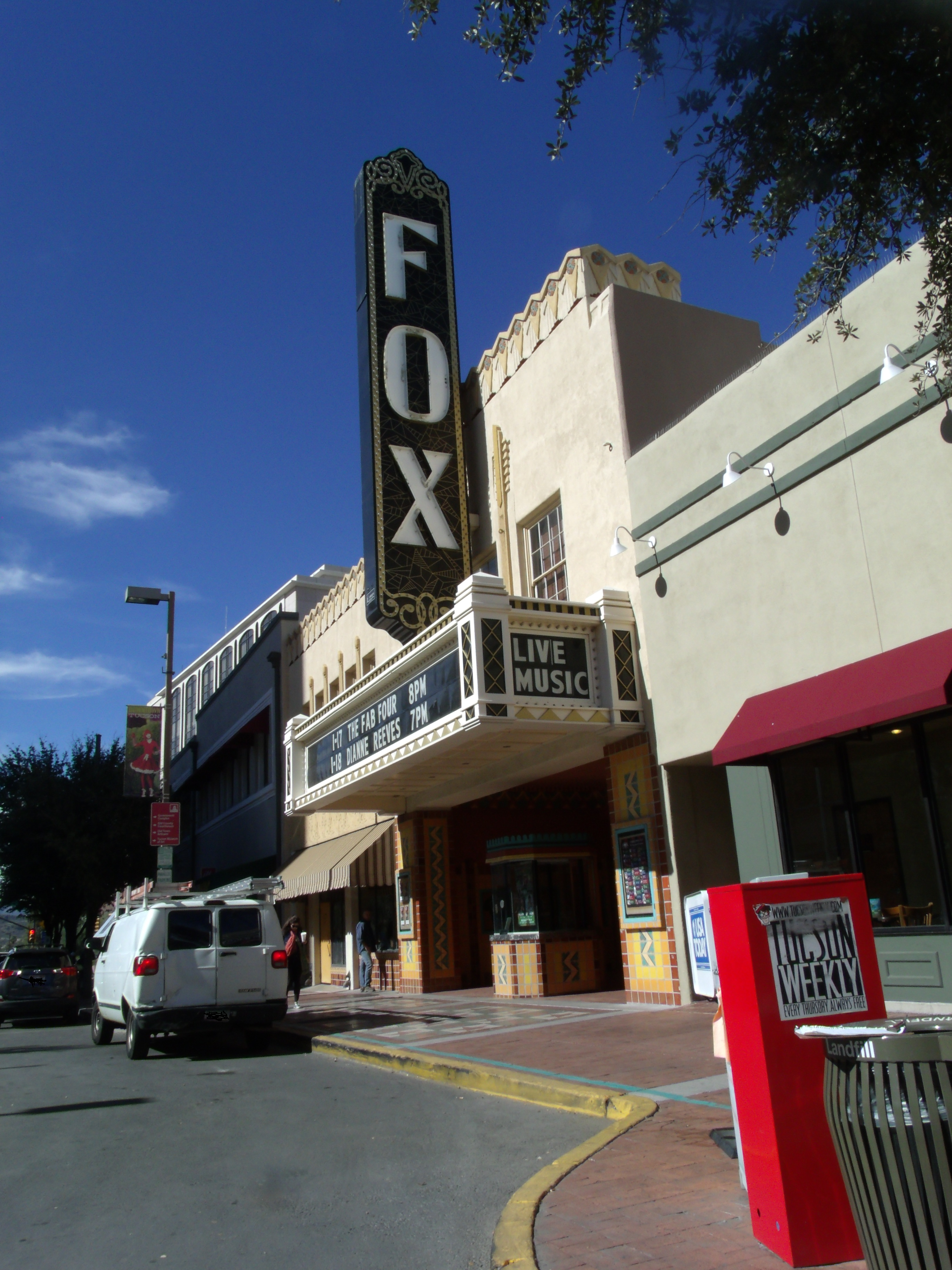
The Fox Theatre.

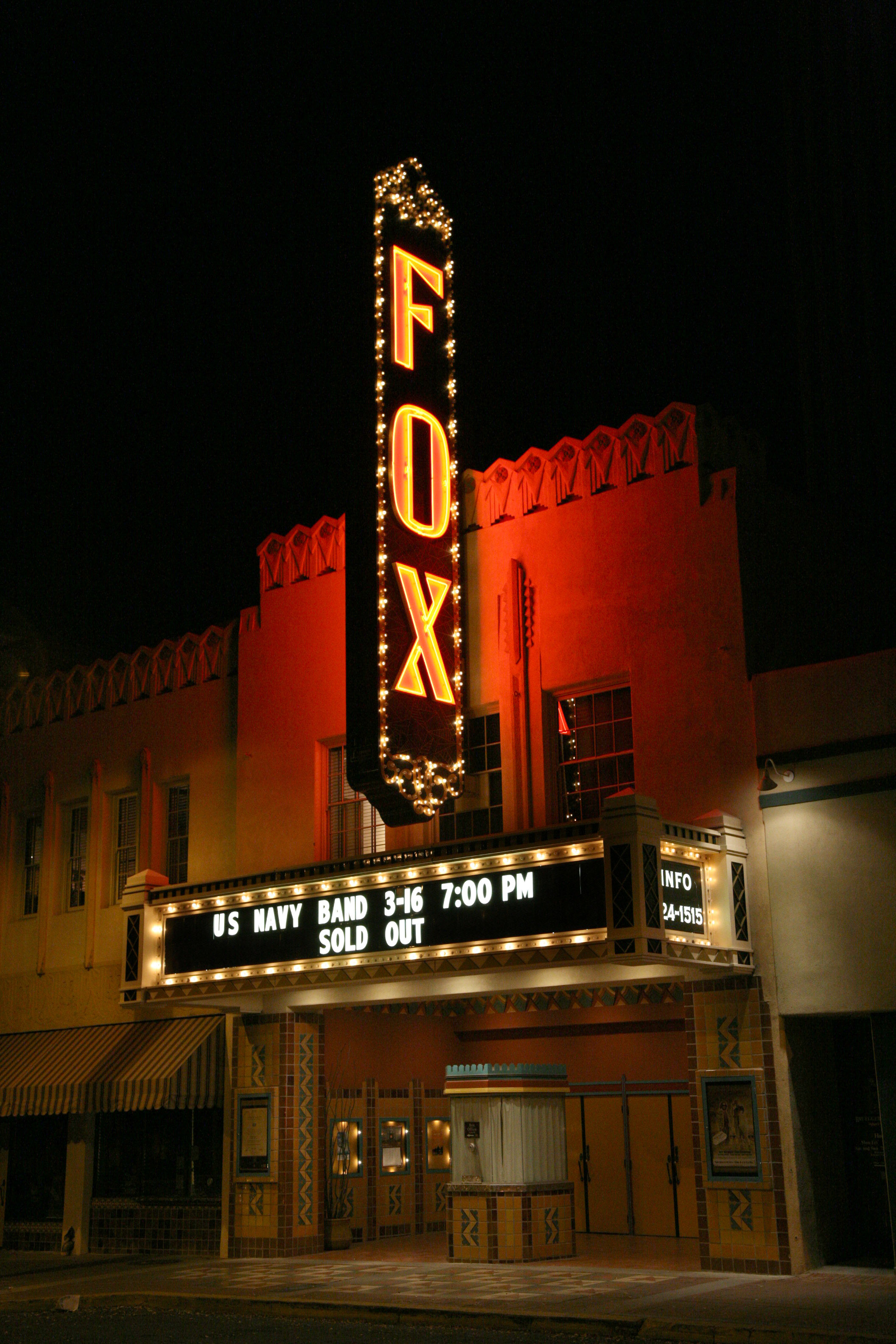
The Fox Tucson Theater at night.

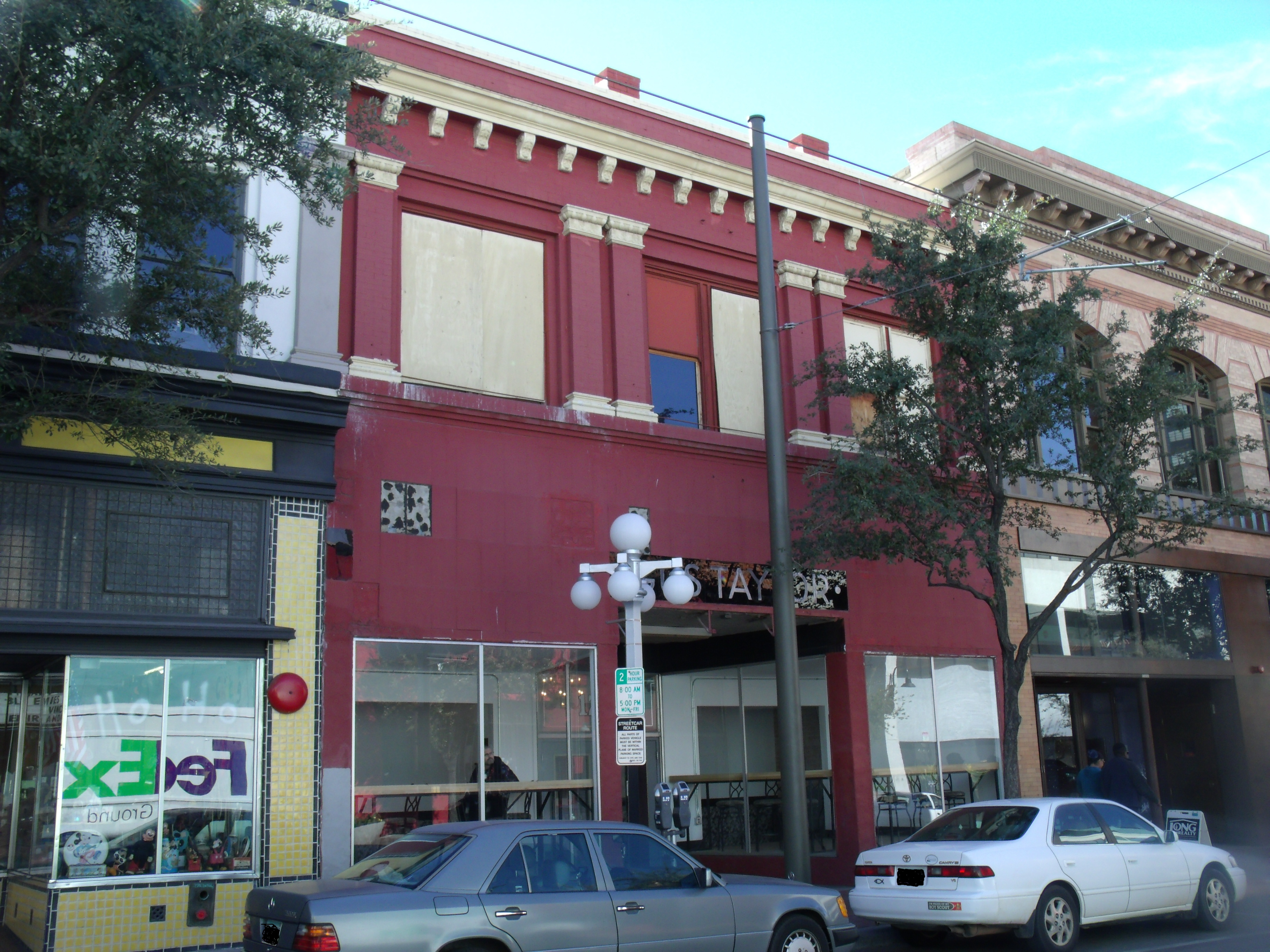
The First Hillinger Bank.

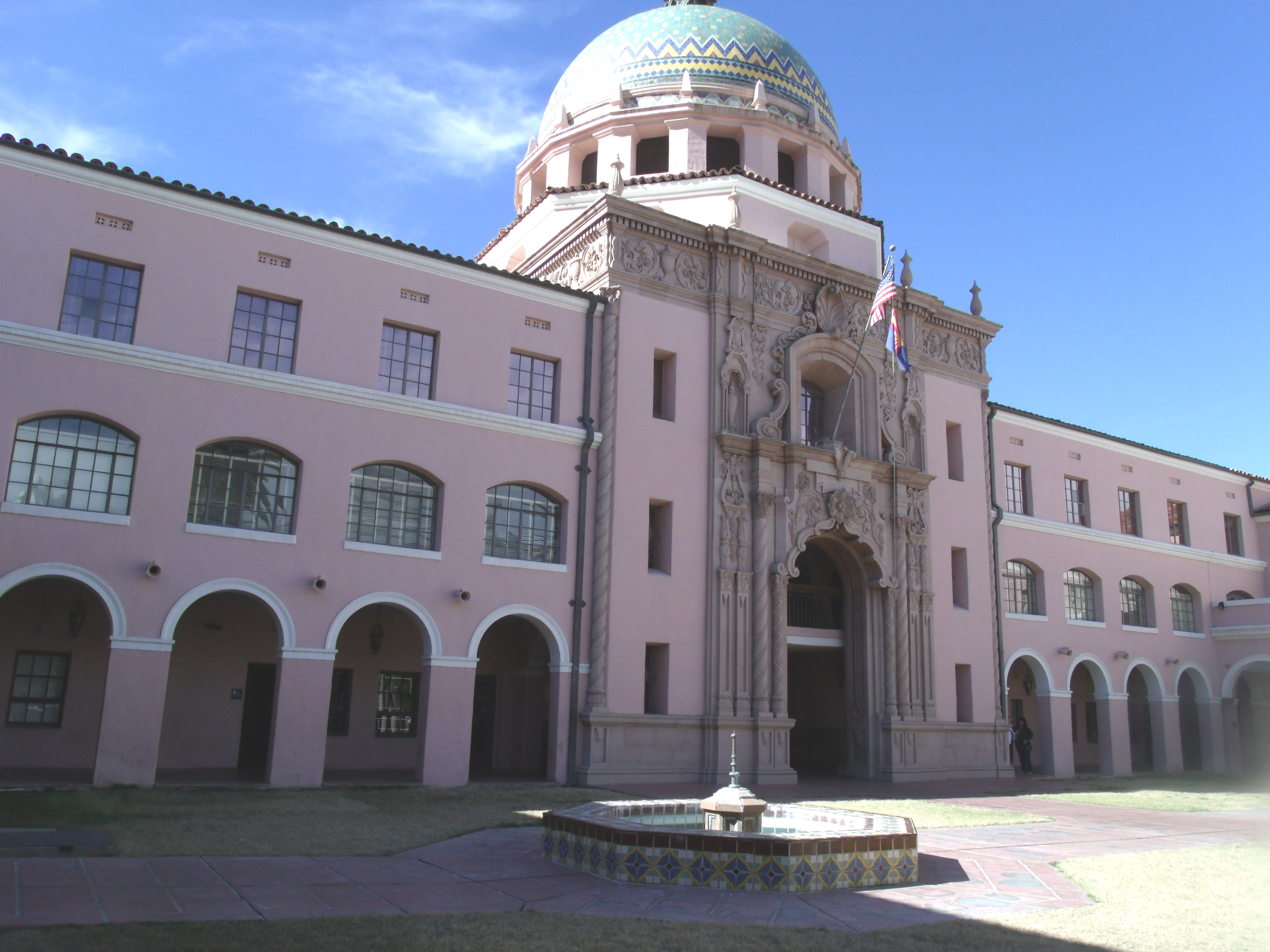
The Old Pima County Court.

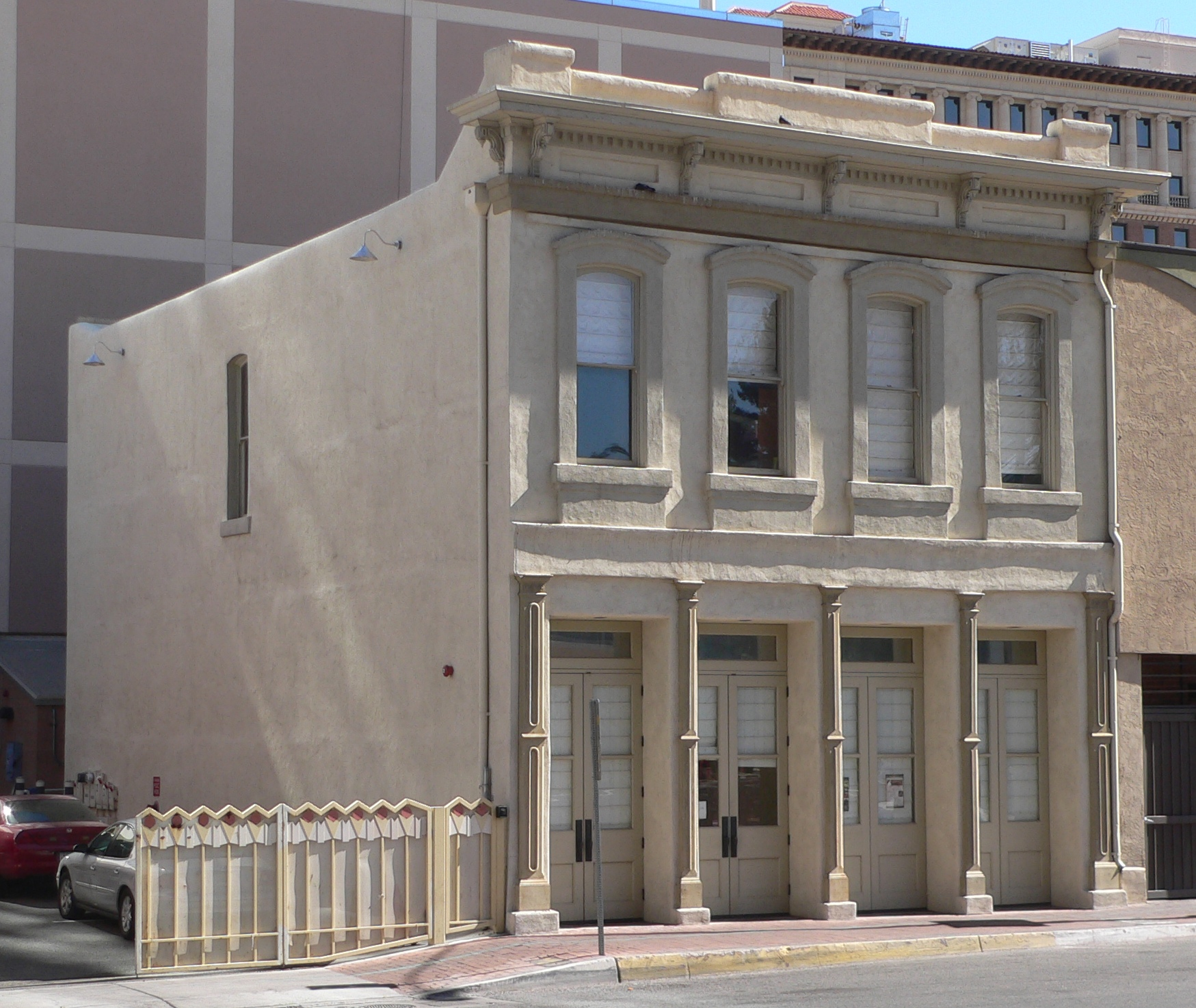
The Arizona Daily Star Building.

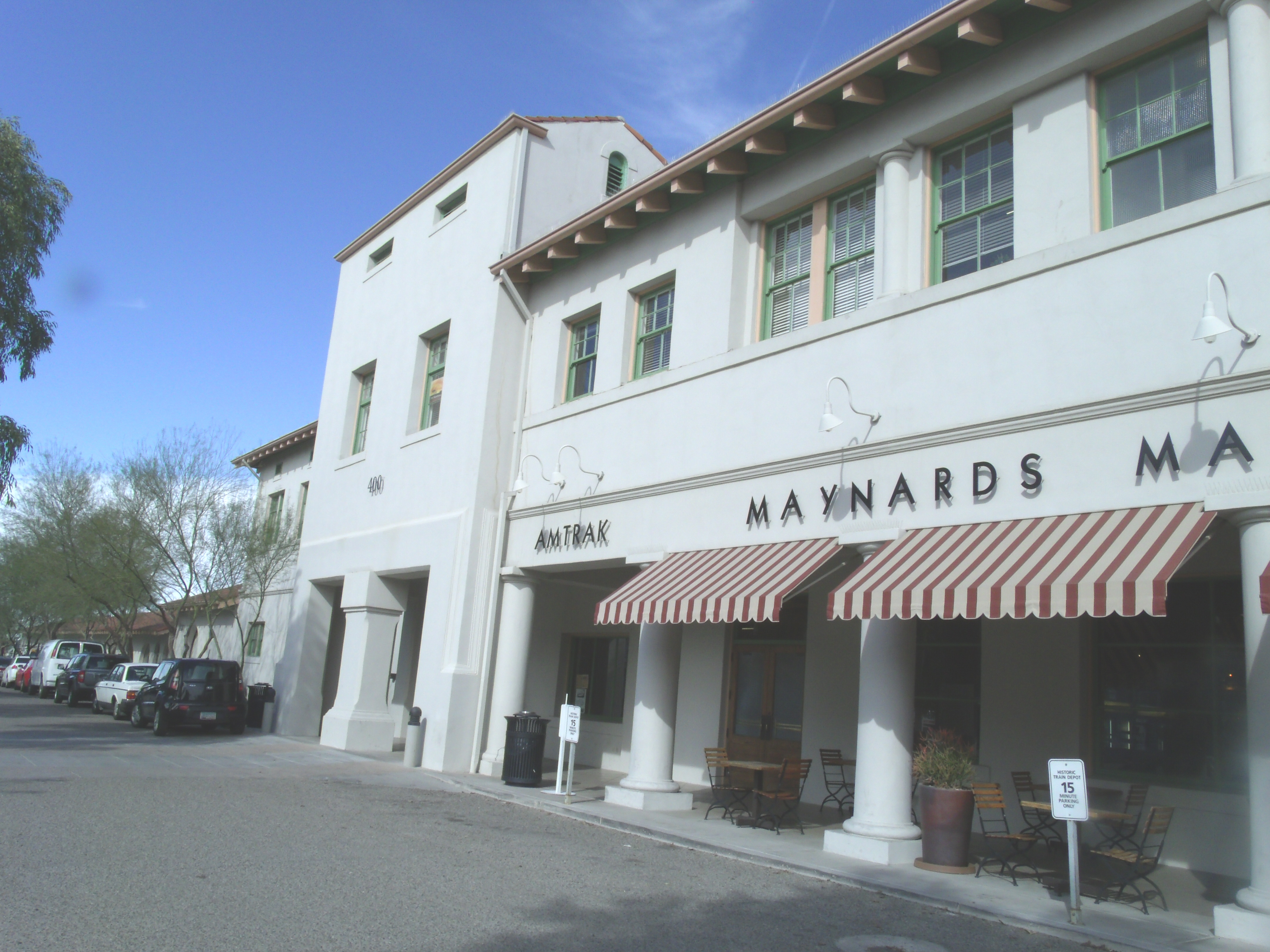
The Amtrak Station.

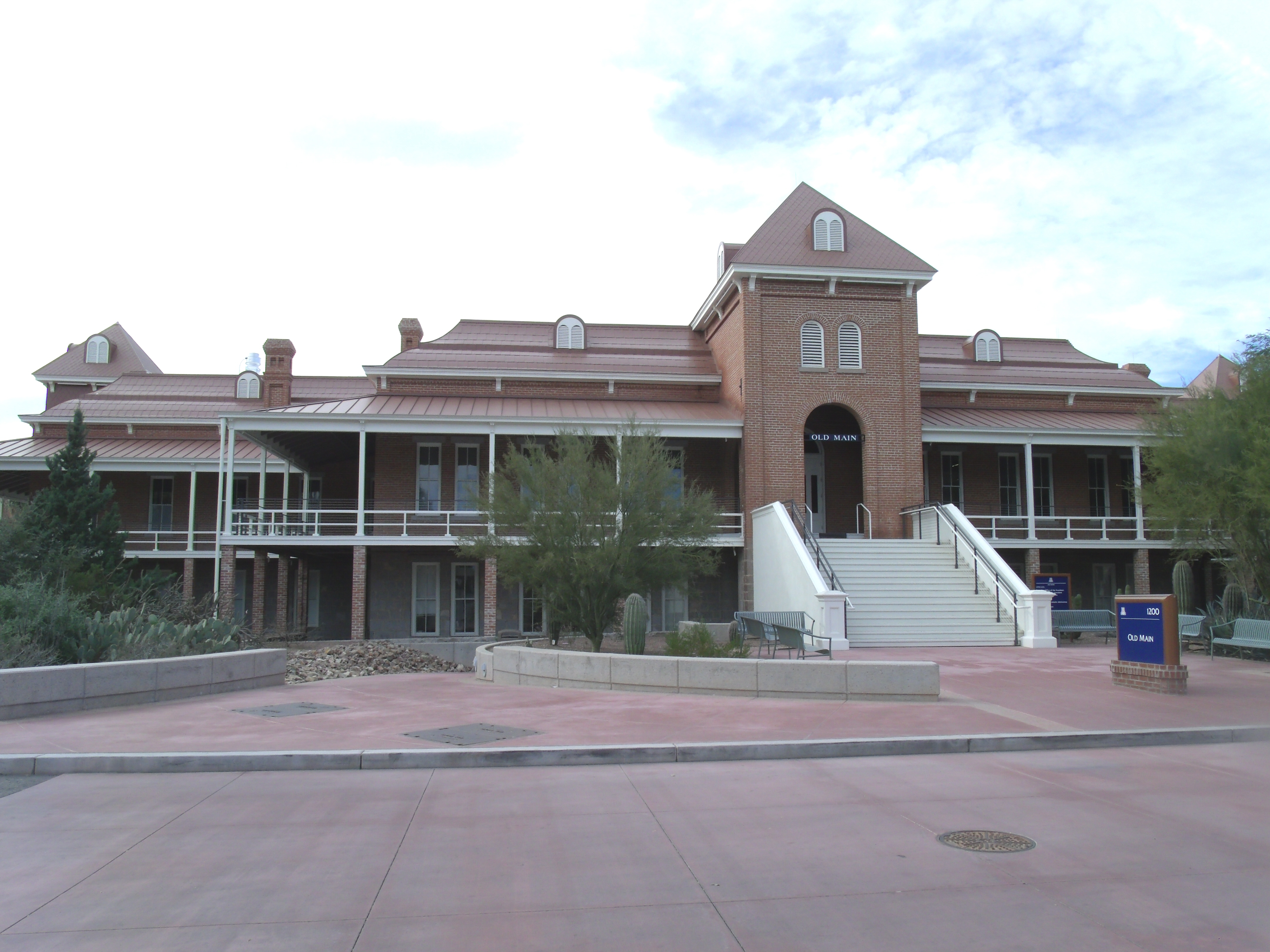
The Old Main, University of Arizona, also known as the University of Arizona School of Agriculture.

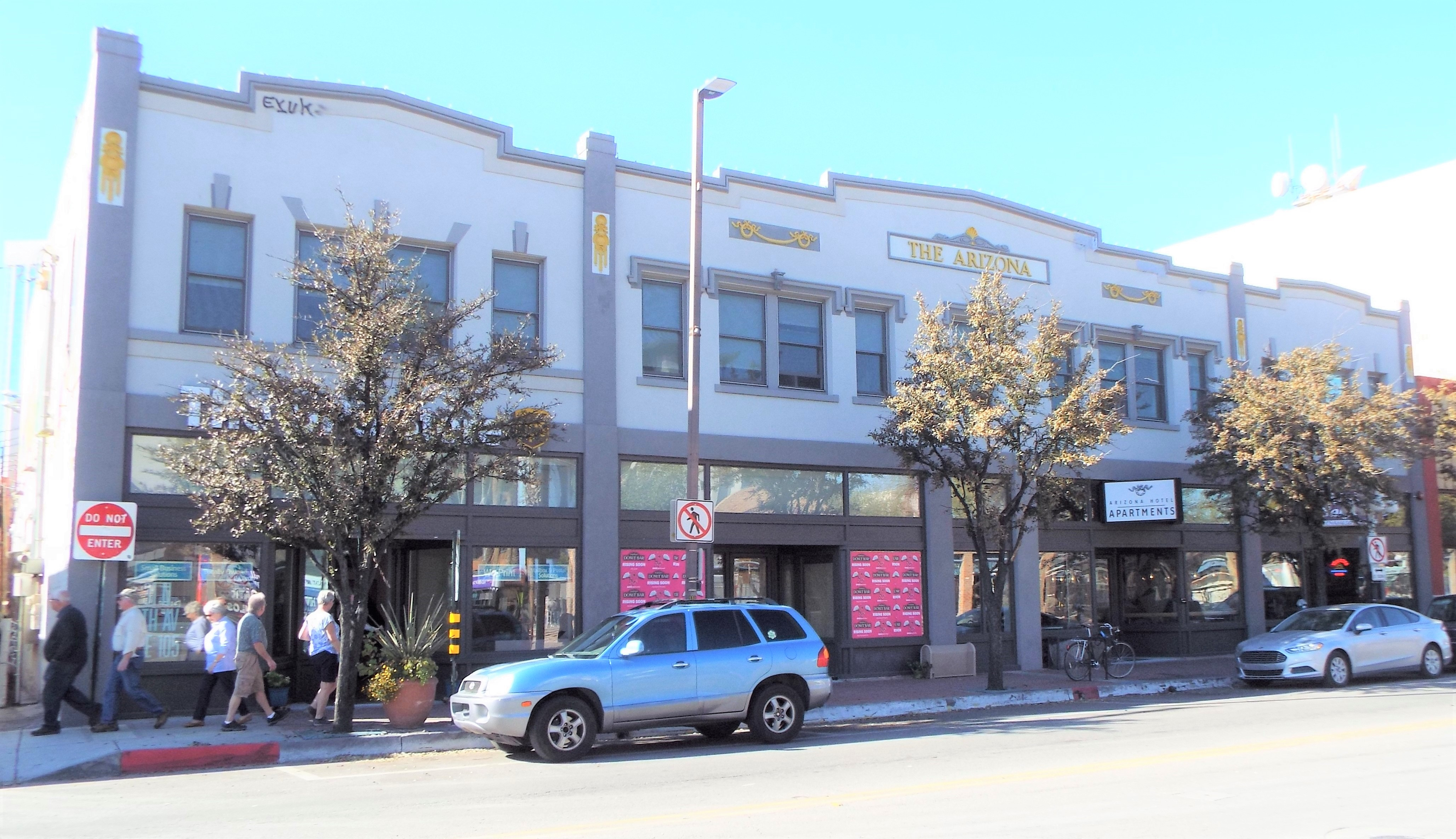
Arizona Hotel.

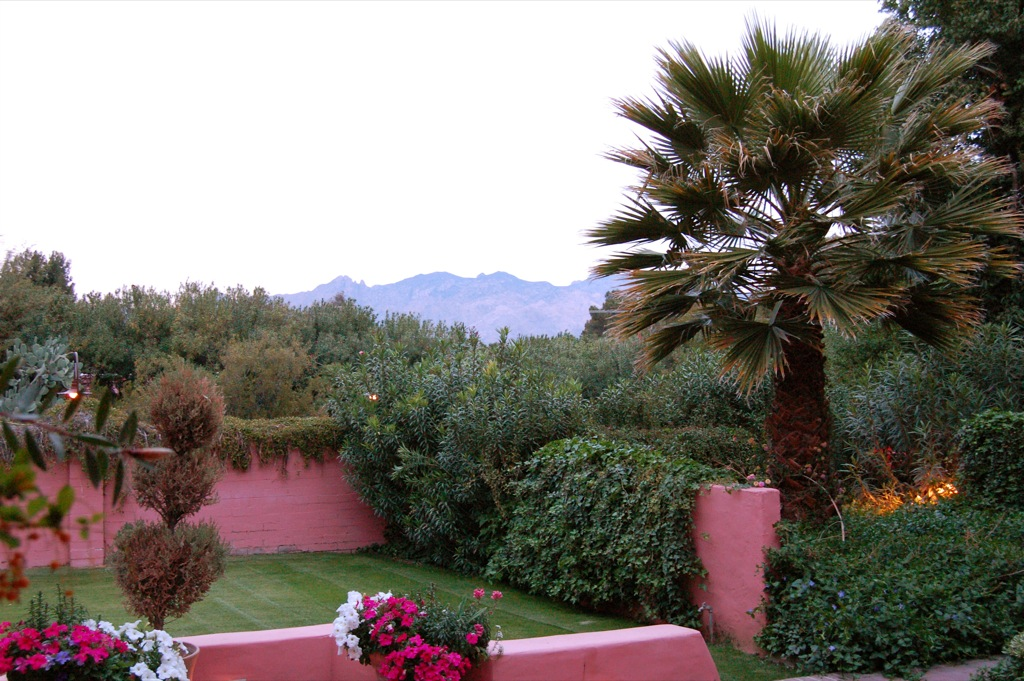
The Arizona Inn gardens.

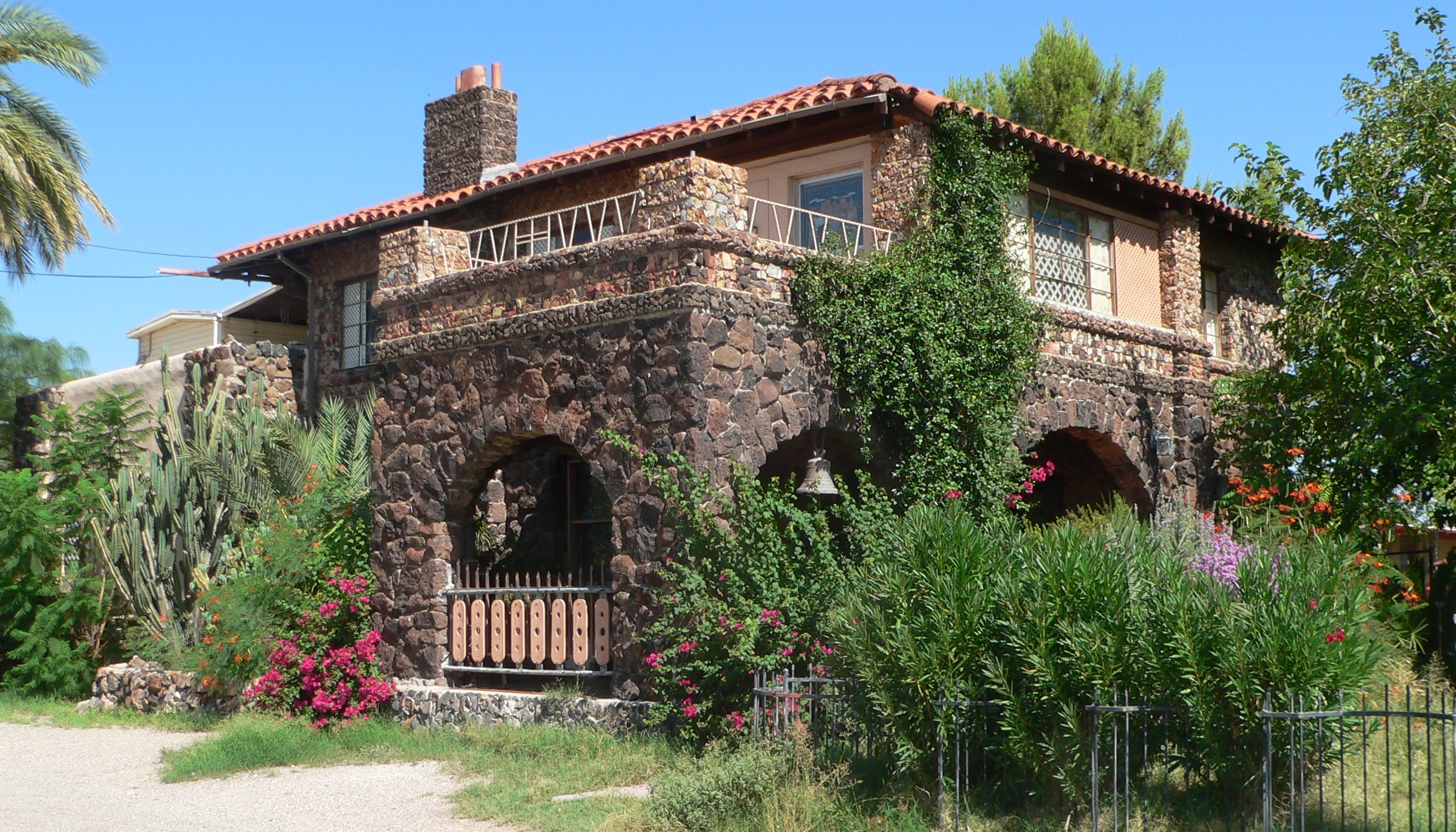
Copper Bell Bed and Breakfast.

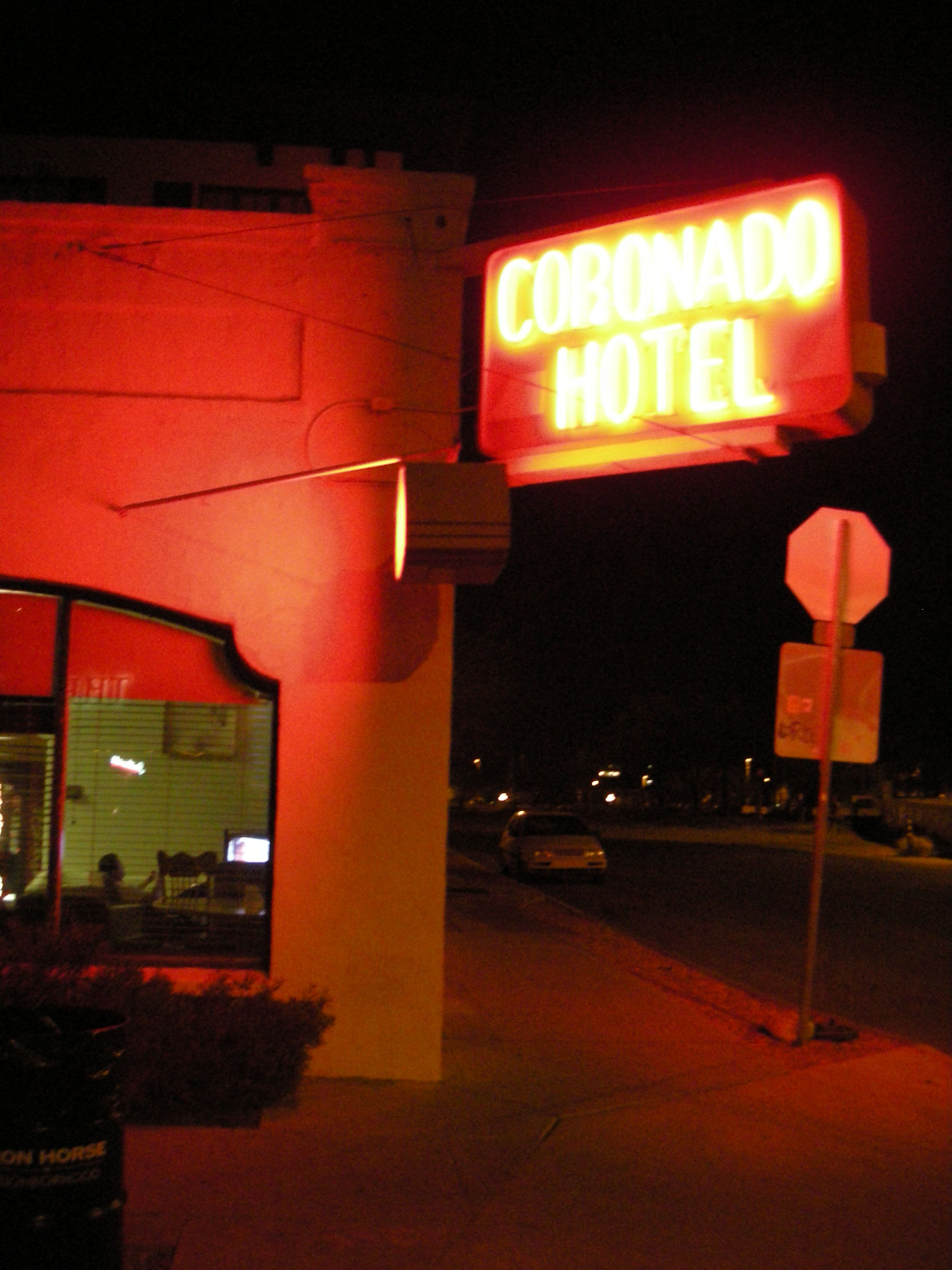
Coronado Hotel.

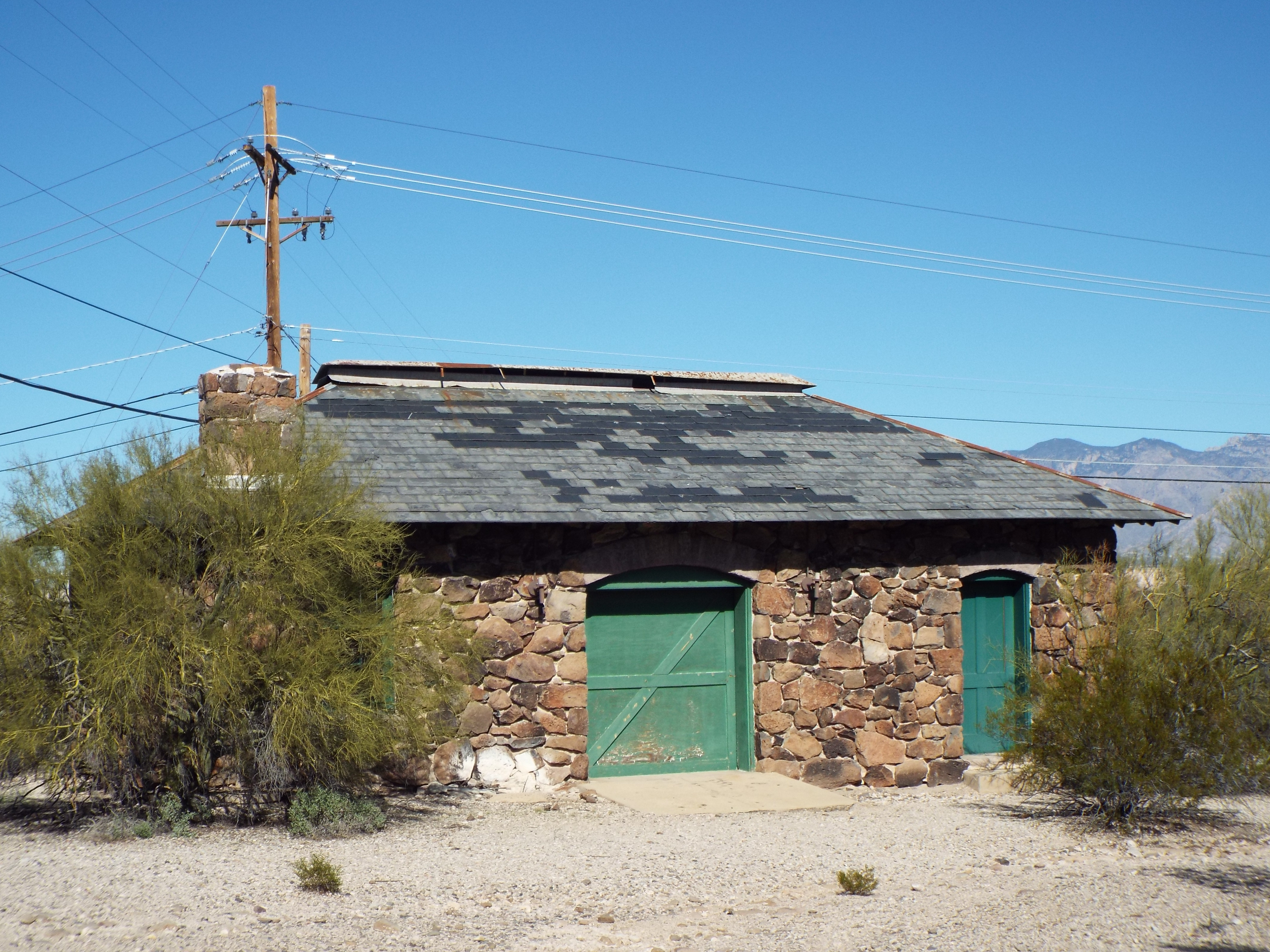
Desert Laboratory.

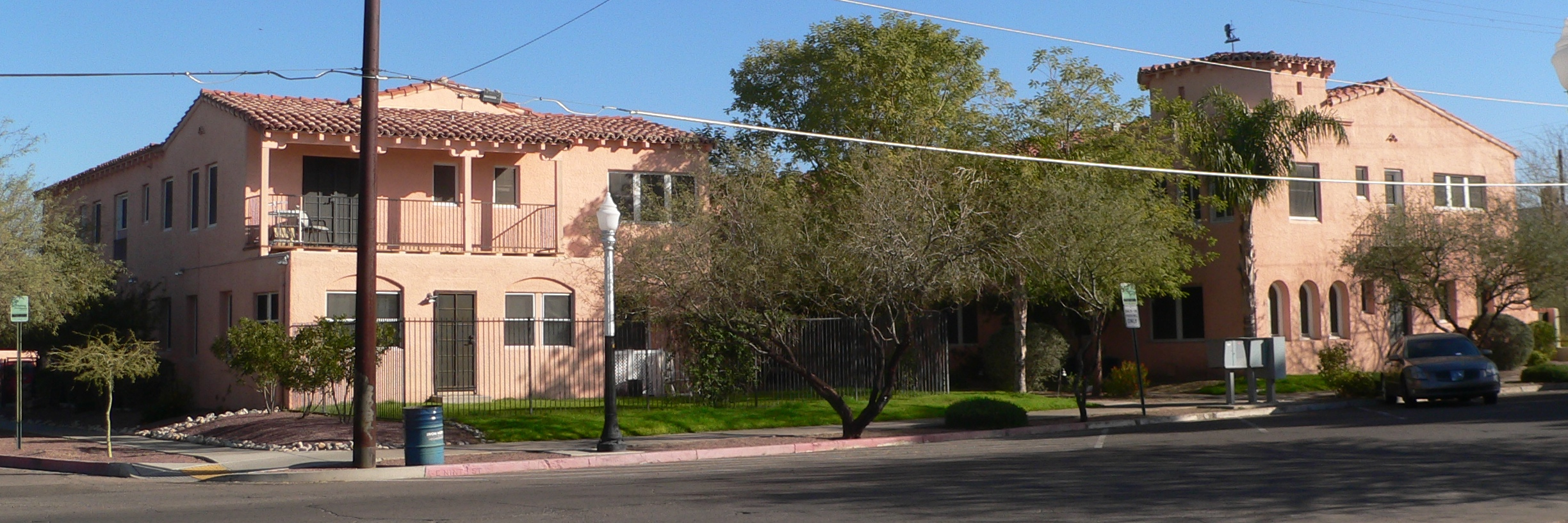
Don Martin Apartments.

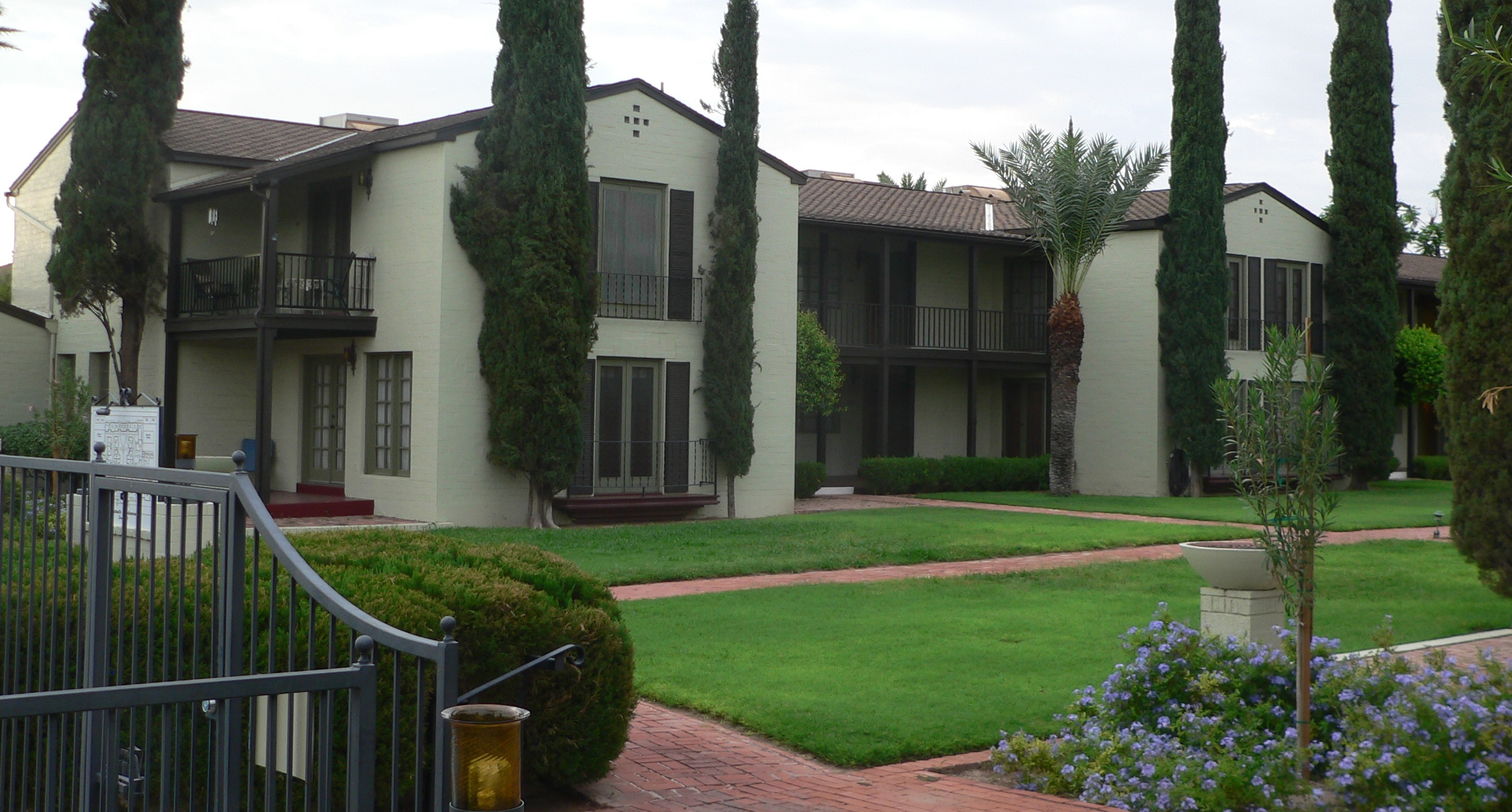
El Encanto Apartments.

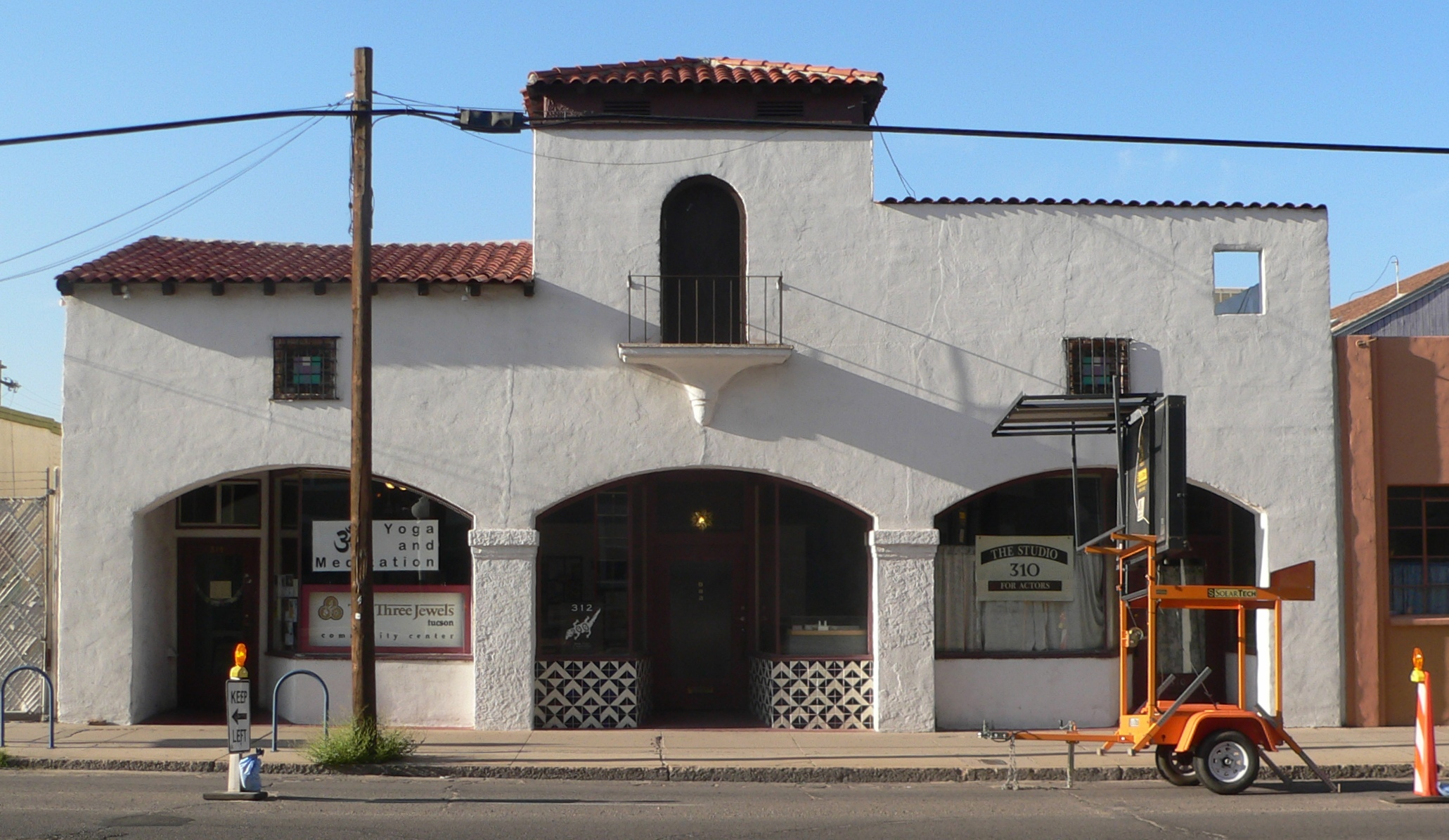
Haynes Building.

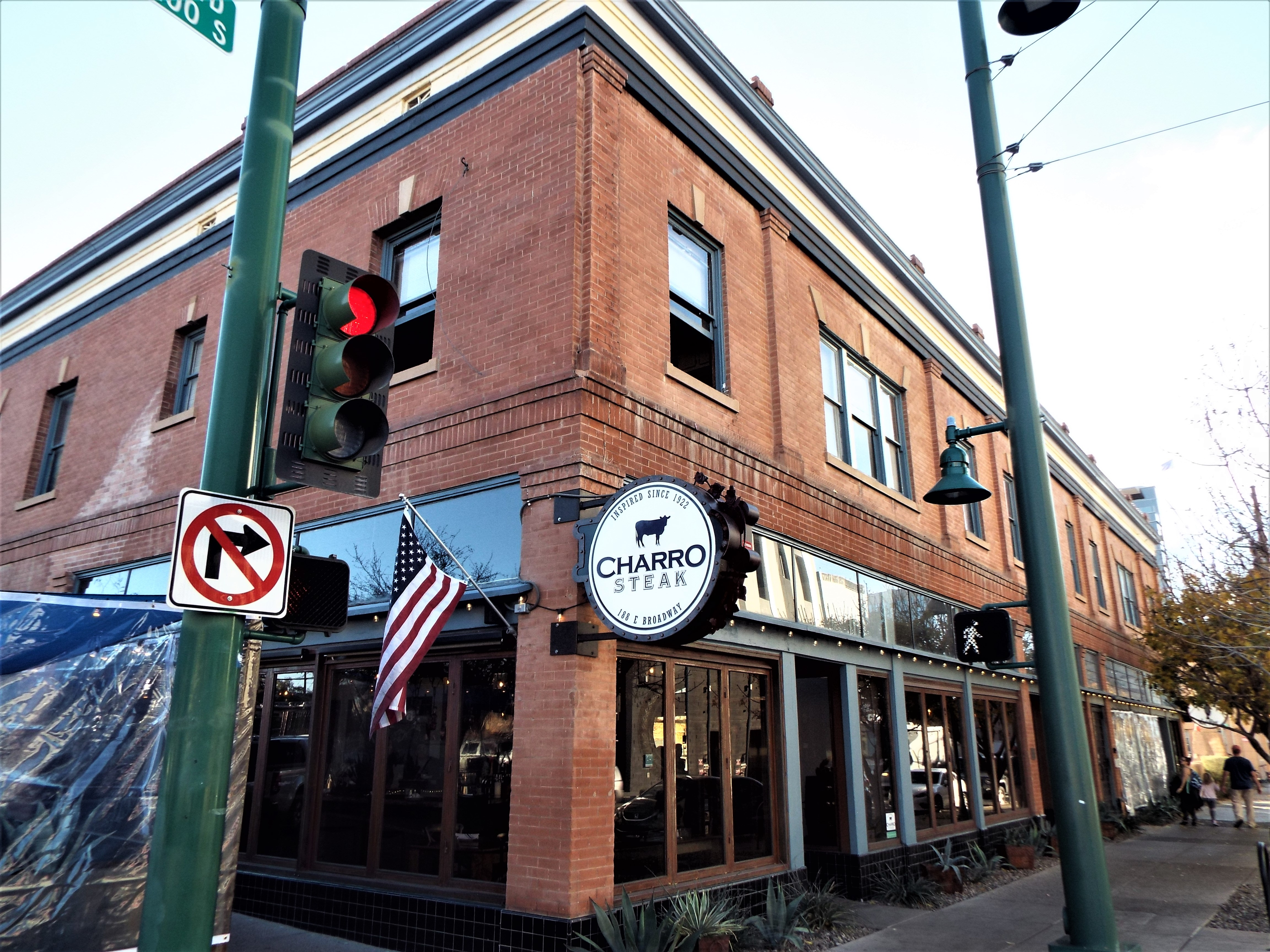
Julian-Drew building

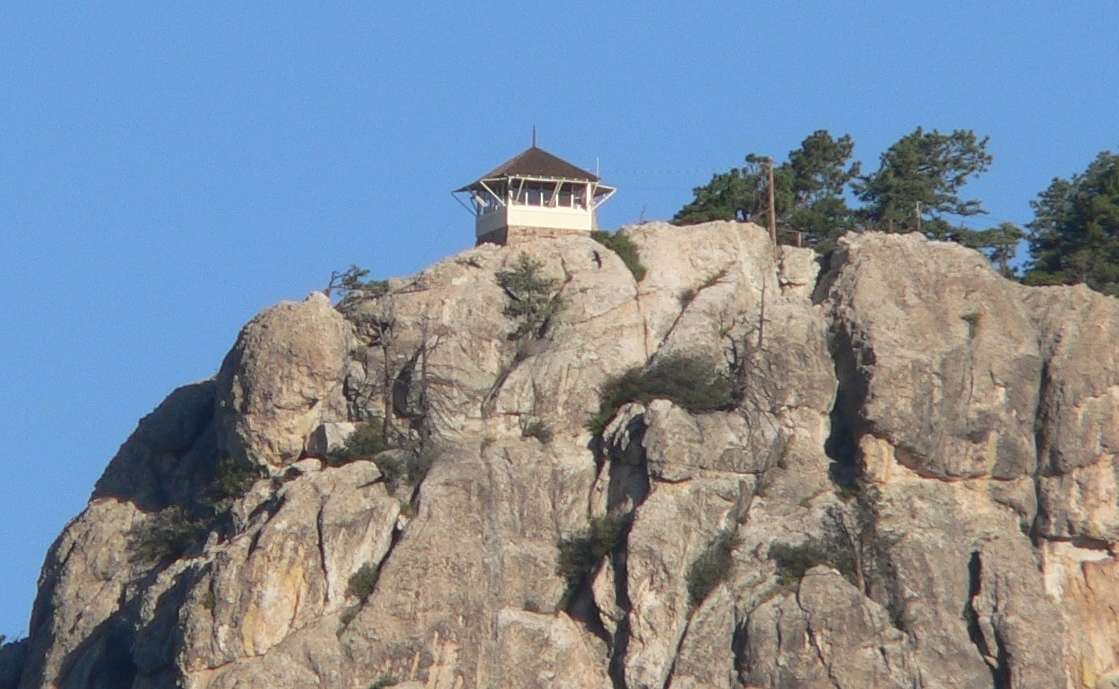
Lemmon Rock Lookout House.

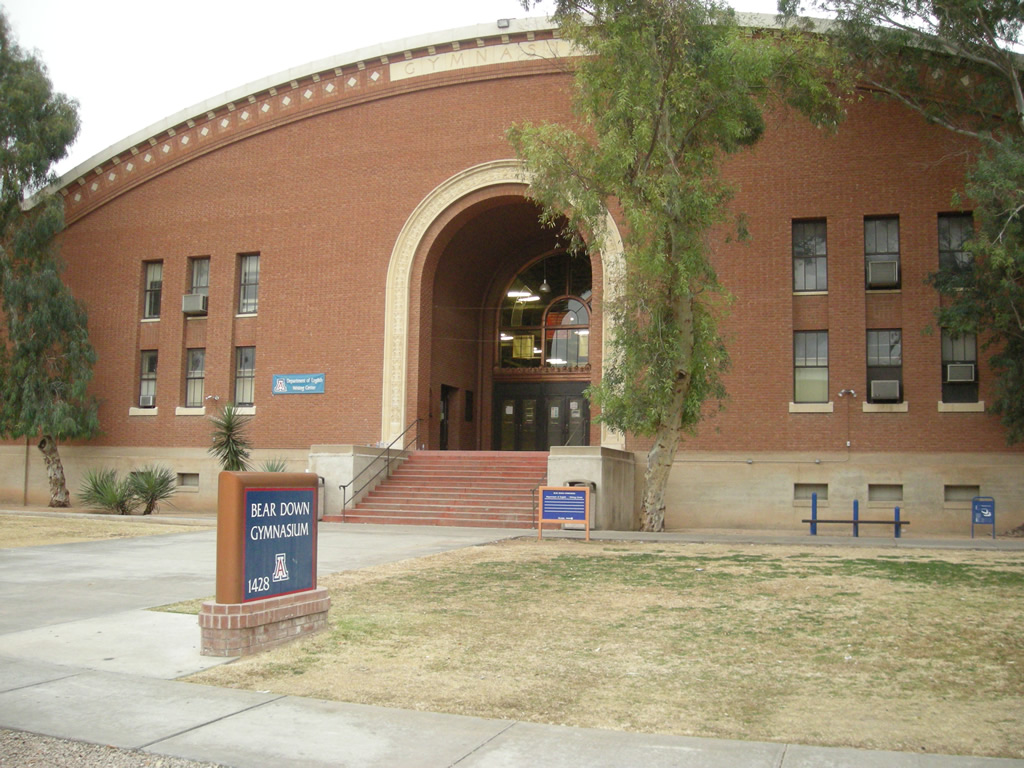
Bear Down Gym.

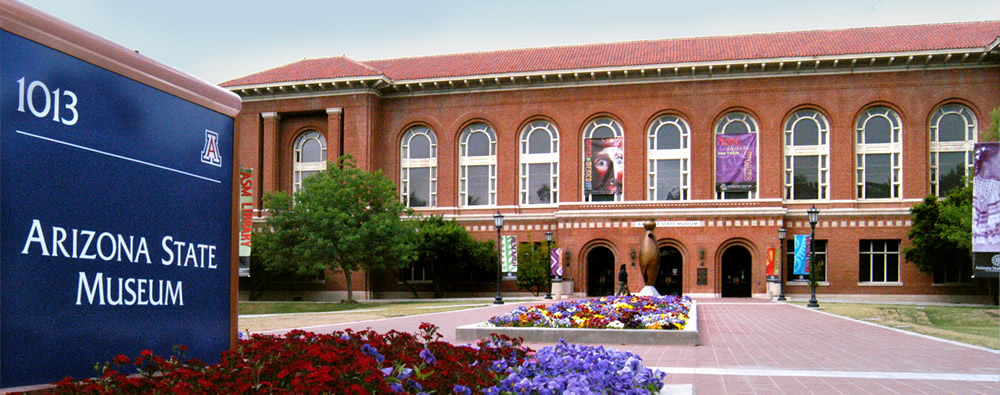
Old Library Building.

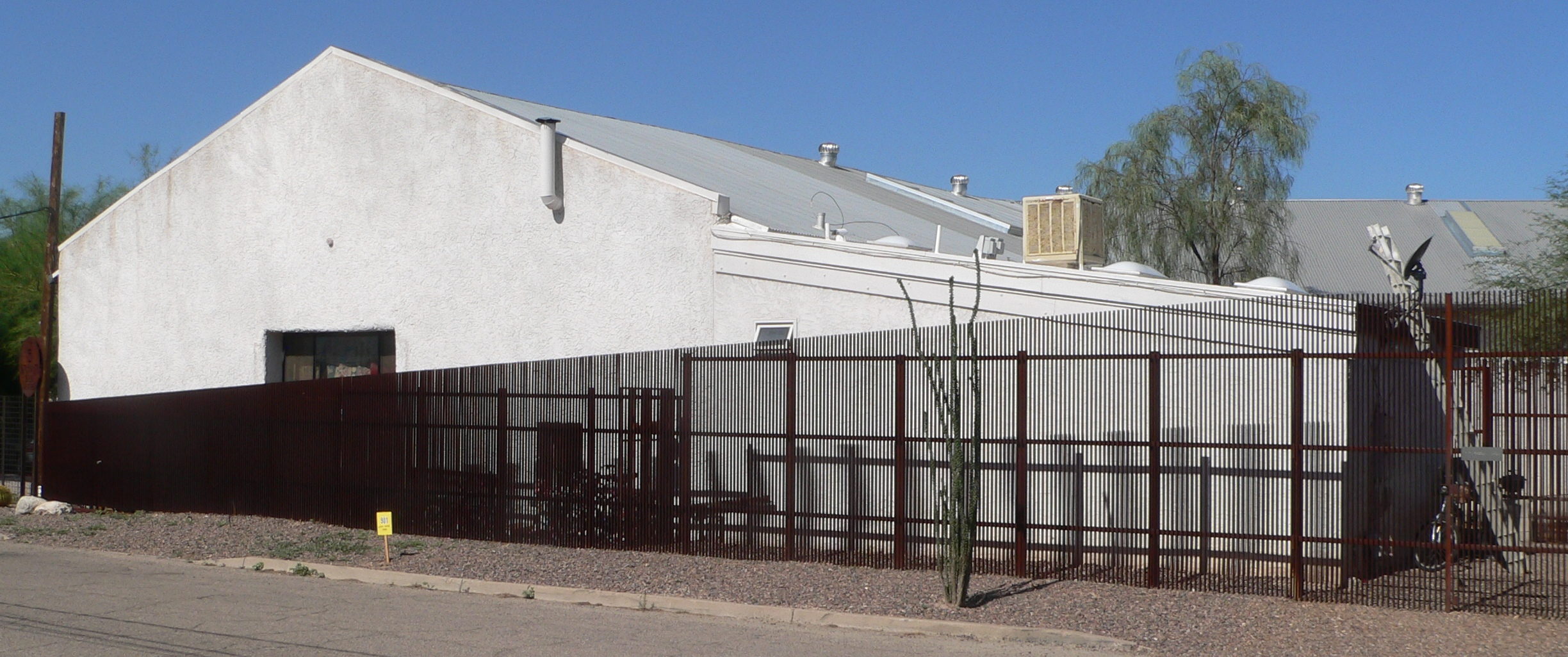
Ronstadt-Sims Adobe Warehouse.

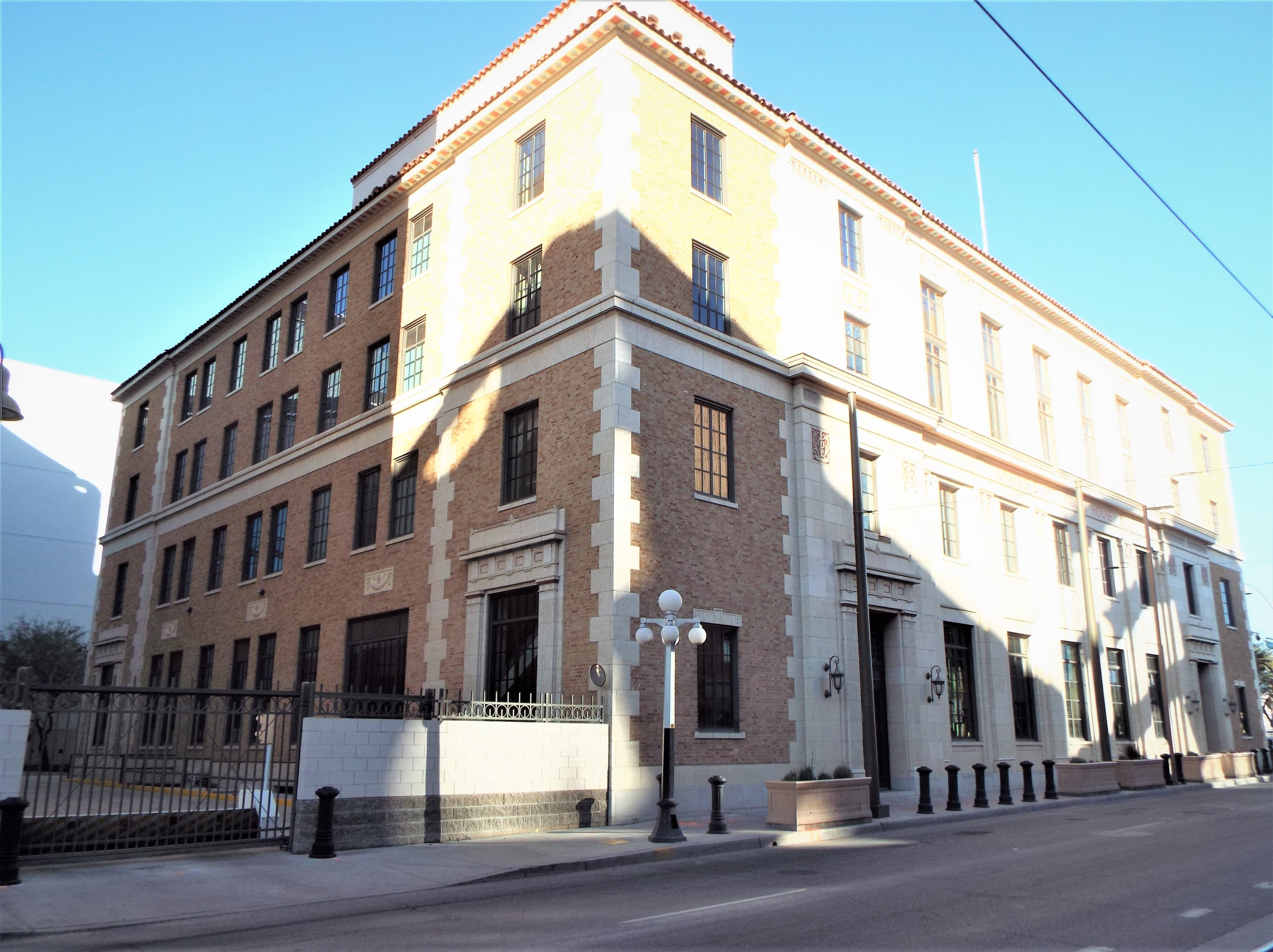
U.S. Post Office and Courthouse.

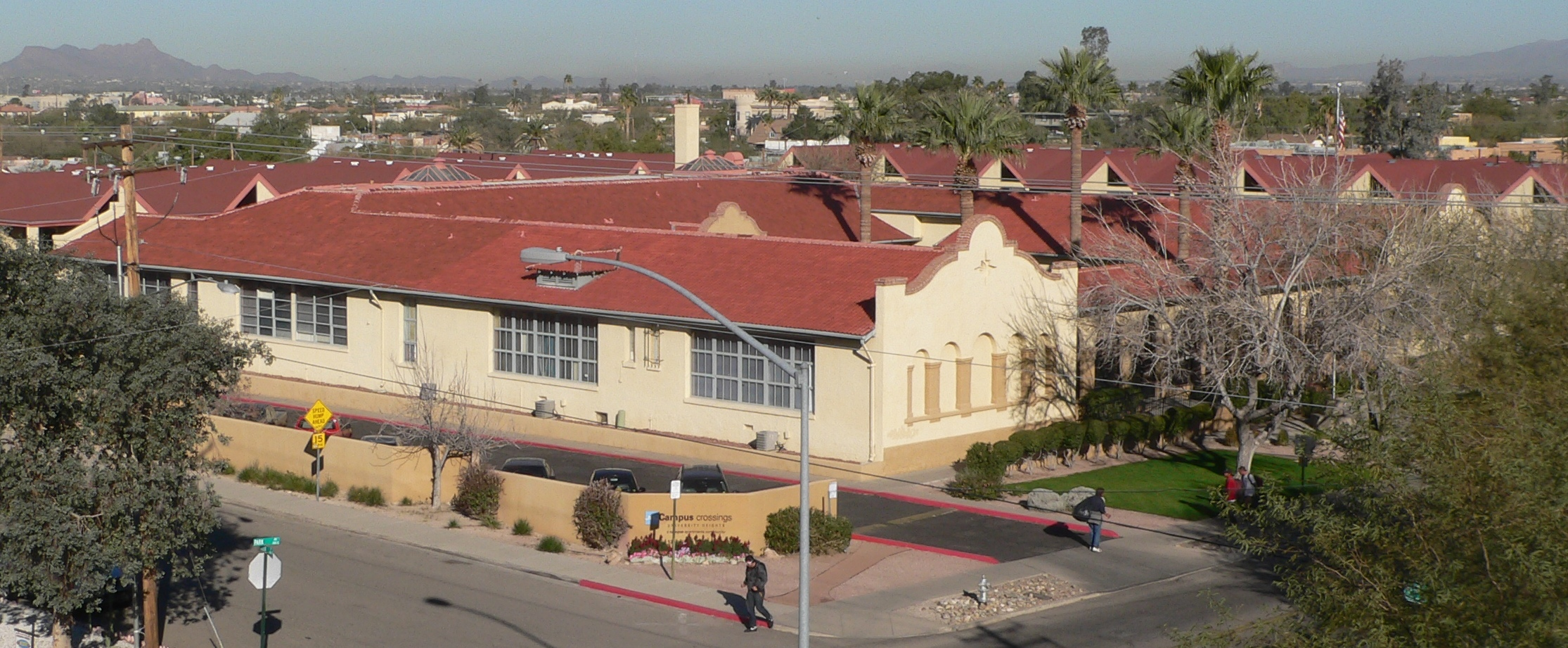
University Heights Elementary School.

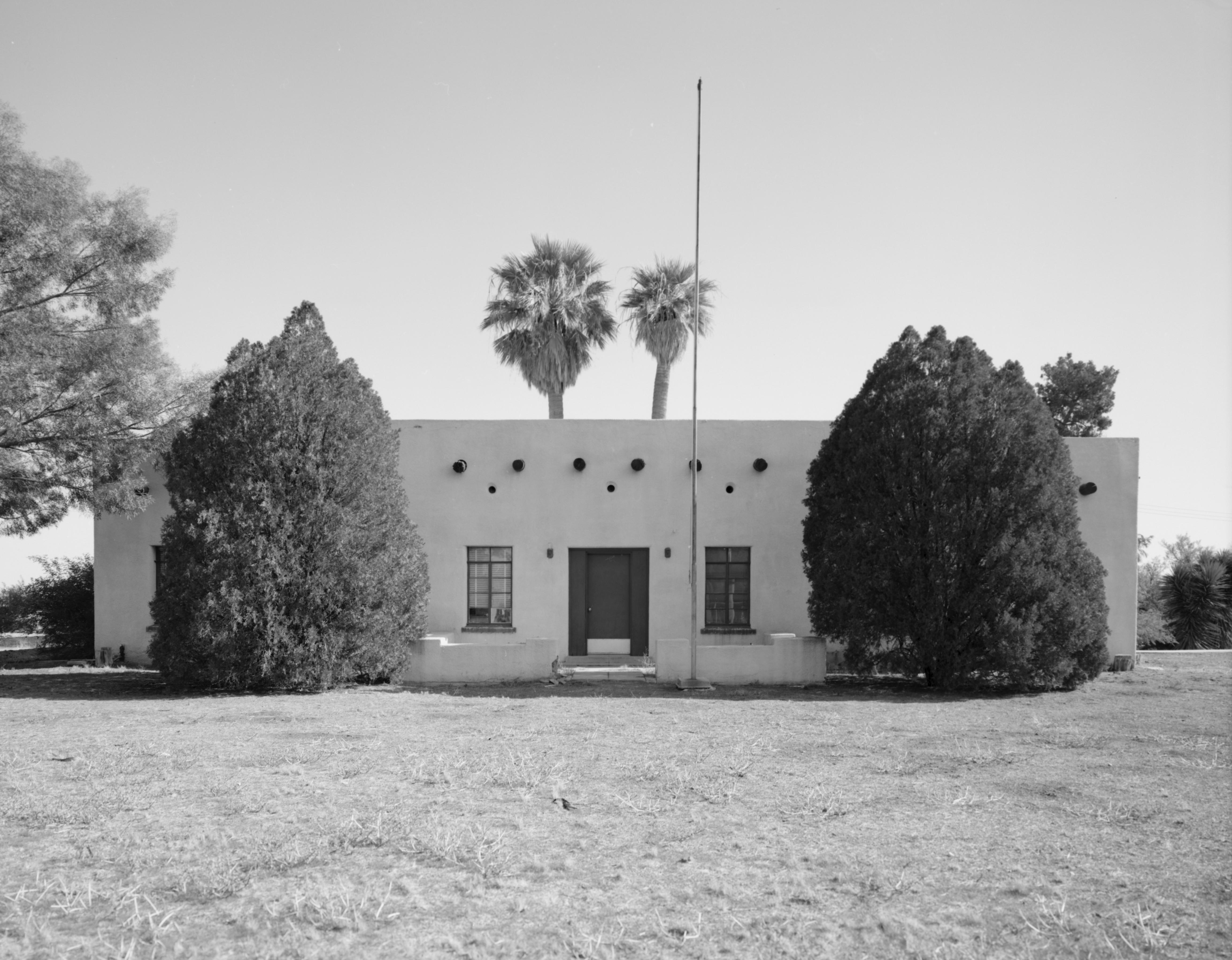
USDA Tucson Plant Materials Center.

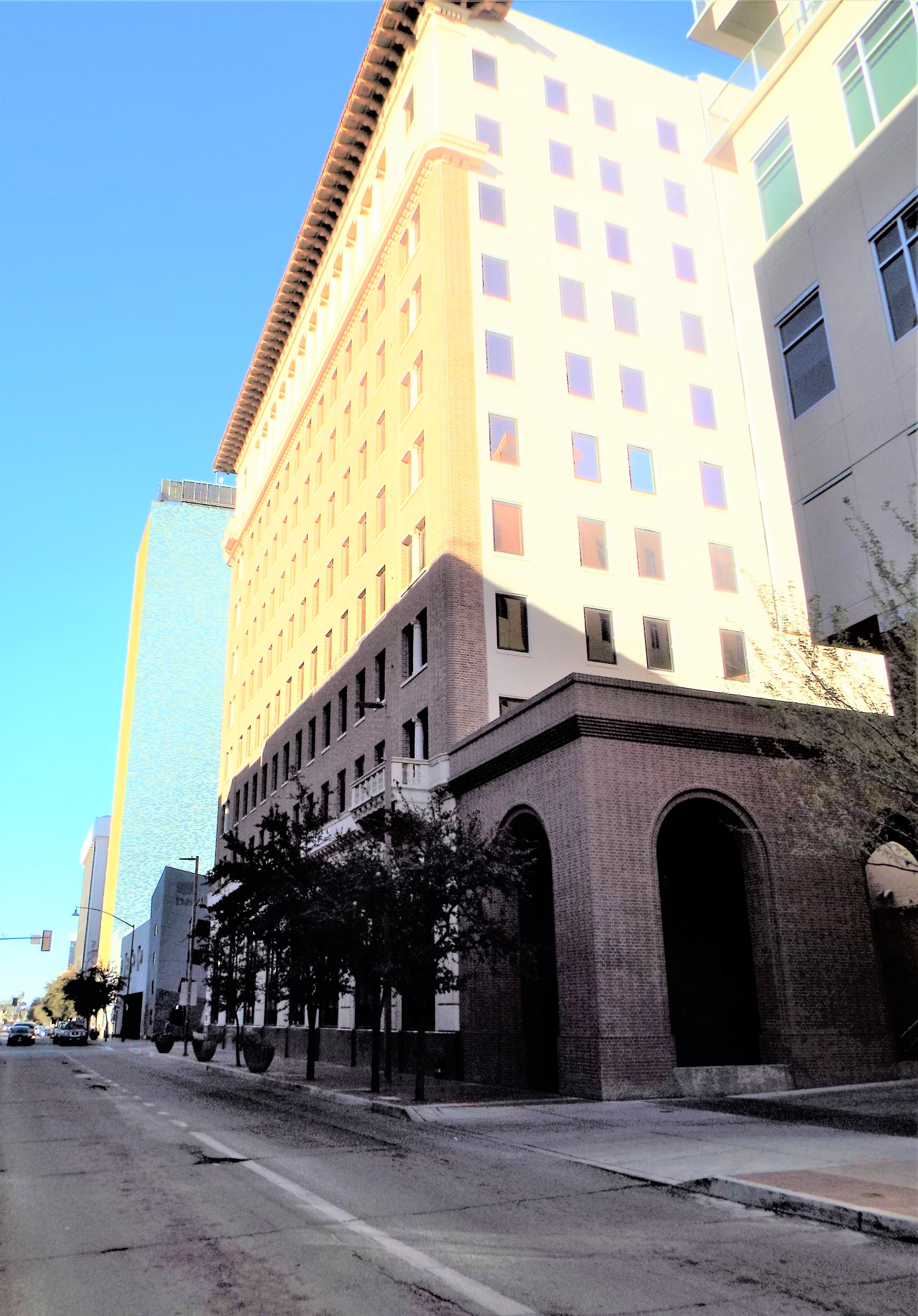
Valley National Bank Building.

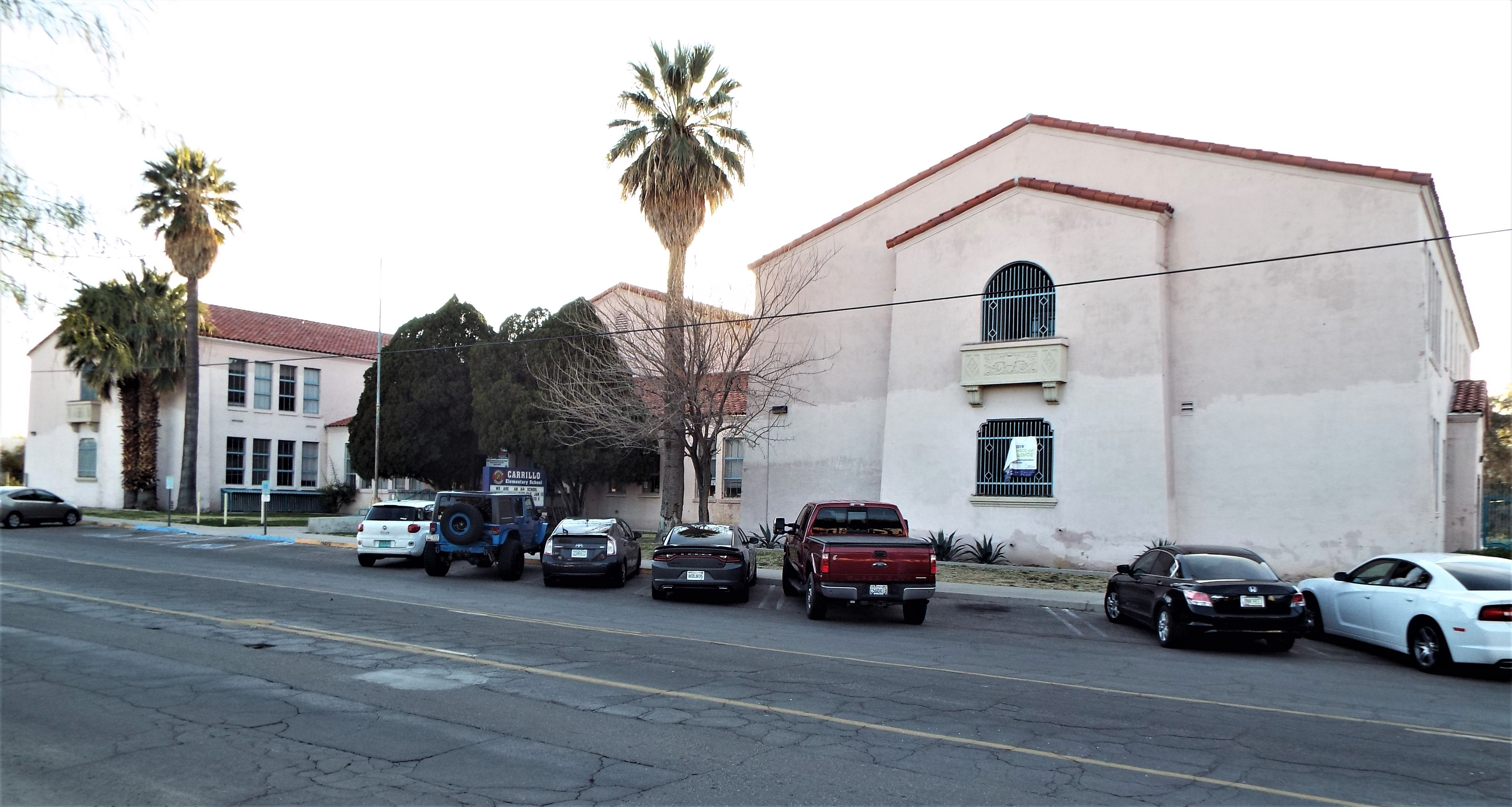
Carrillo Elementary School

The historic property which is not pictured is:

- The Catalina Foothills Estates Apartments located at 2600 E. Skyline Dr. Listed in the National Register of Historic Places on September 8, 2015, reference: #15000568.

=== Hotel Congress ===
- Hotel Congress was built in 1918 and is located at 303-311 E. Congress Street. The hotel was designed by the Los Angeles architectural firm William and Alexander Curlett as part of an expansion of congress street and in conjunction with the theatrical venue Rialto Theatre, which sits north of Congress street. The outlaw John Dillinger, who was wanted by the F.B.I., escaped from jail in Chicago and resided on the third floor of the hotel under an alias. On January 22, 1934, a fire started in the basement of the hotel and spread up the elevator to the third floor. This fire, and the subsequent chain of events, led to the capture of Dillinger. The hotel celebrates his capture each third weekend in January with Dillinger Days, featuring reenactments of the events which led to Dillinger's capture. The hotel was listed in the National Register of Historic Places on September 12, 2003, reference: #03000906.
Historic Hotel Congress

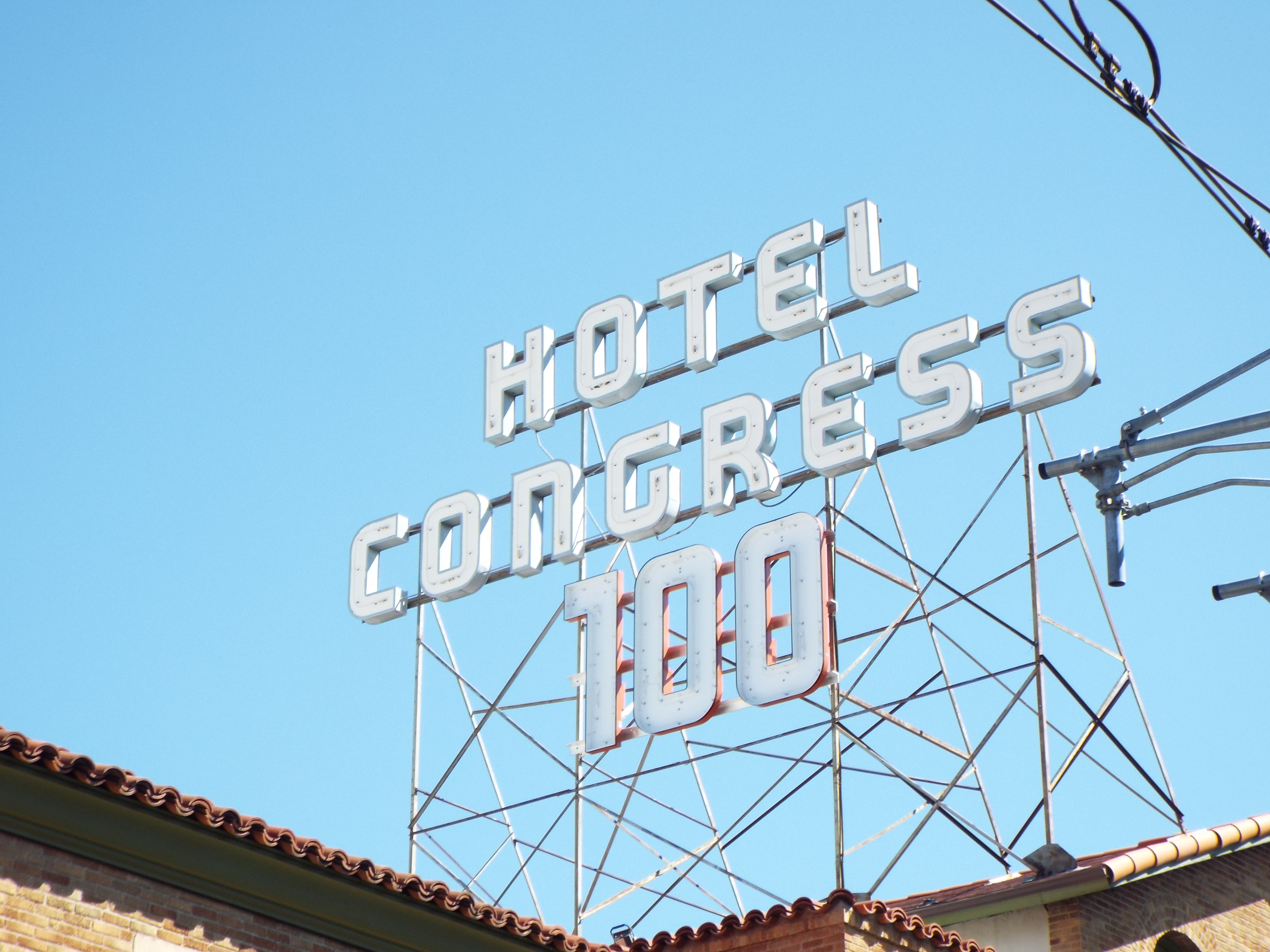
Hotel Congress 100th Anniversary

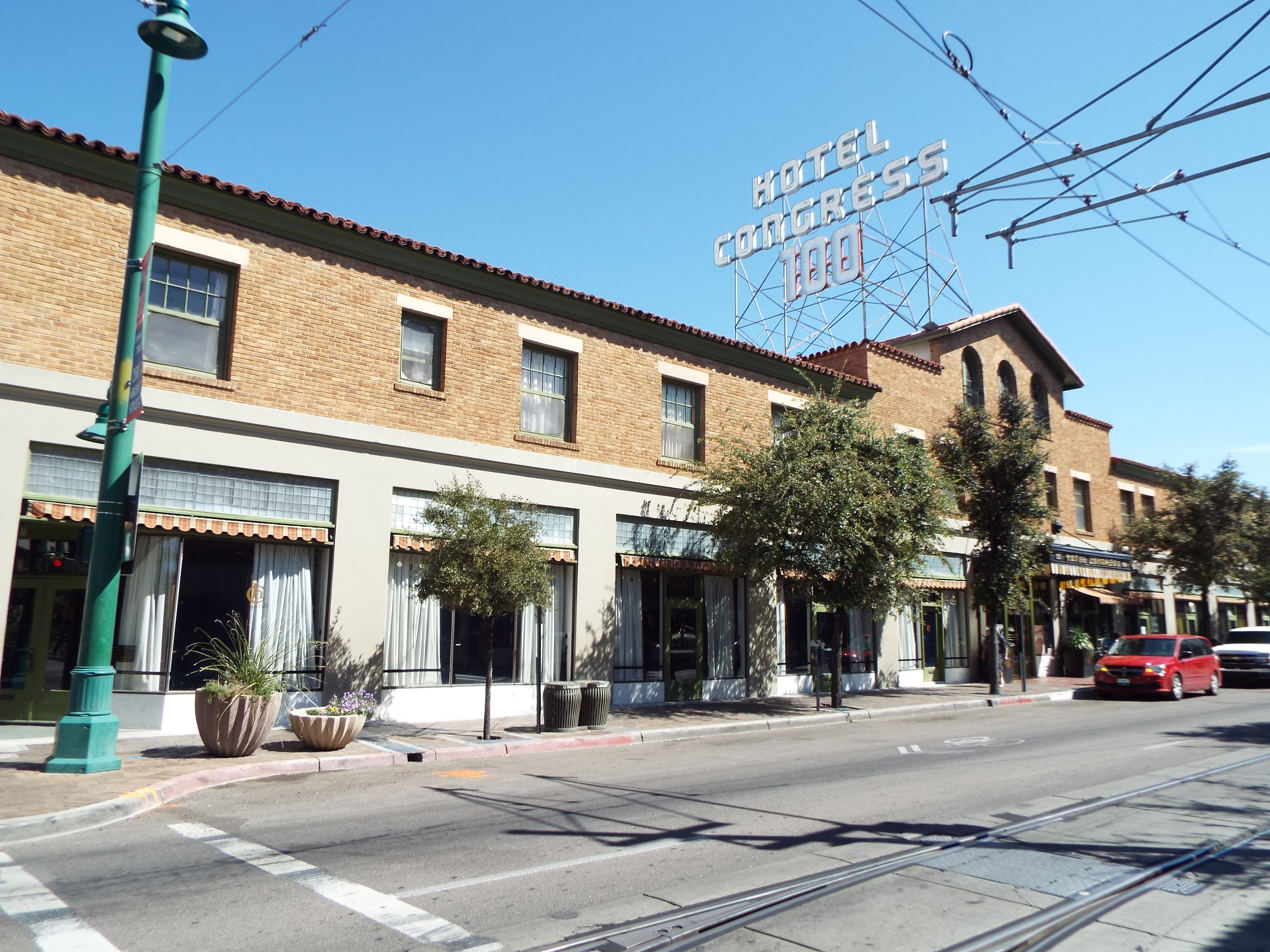
Hotel Congress

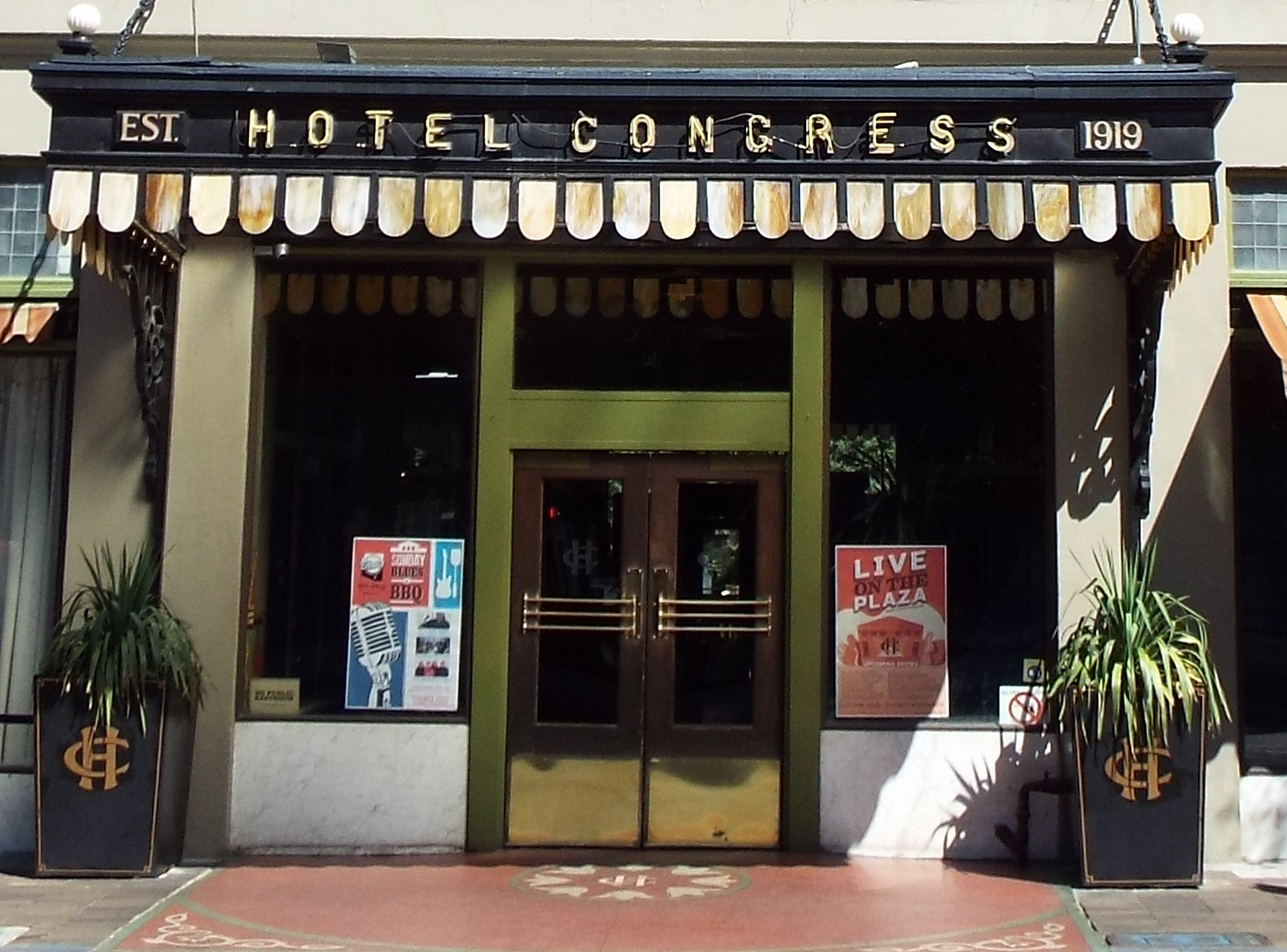
Hotel entrance

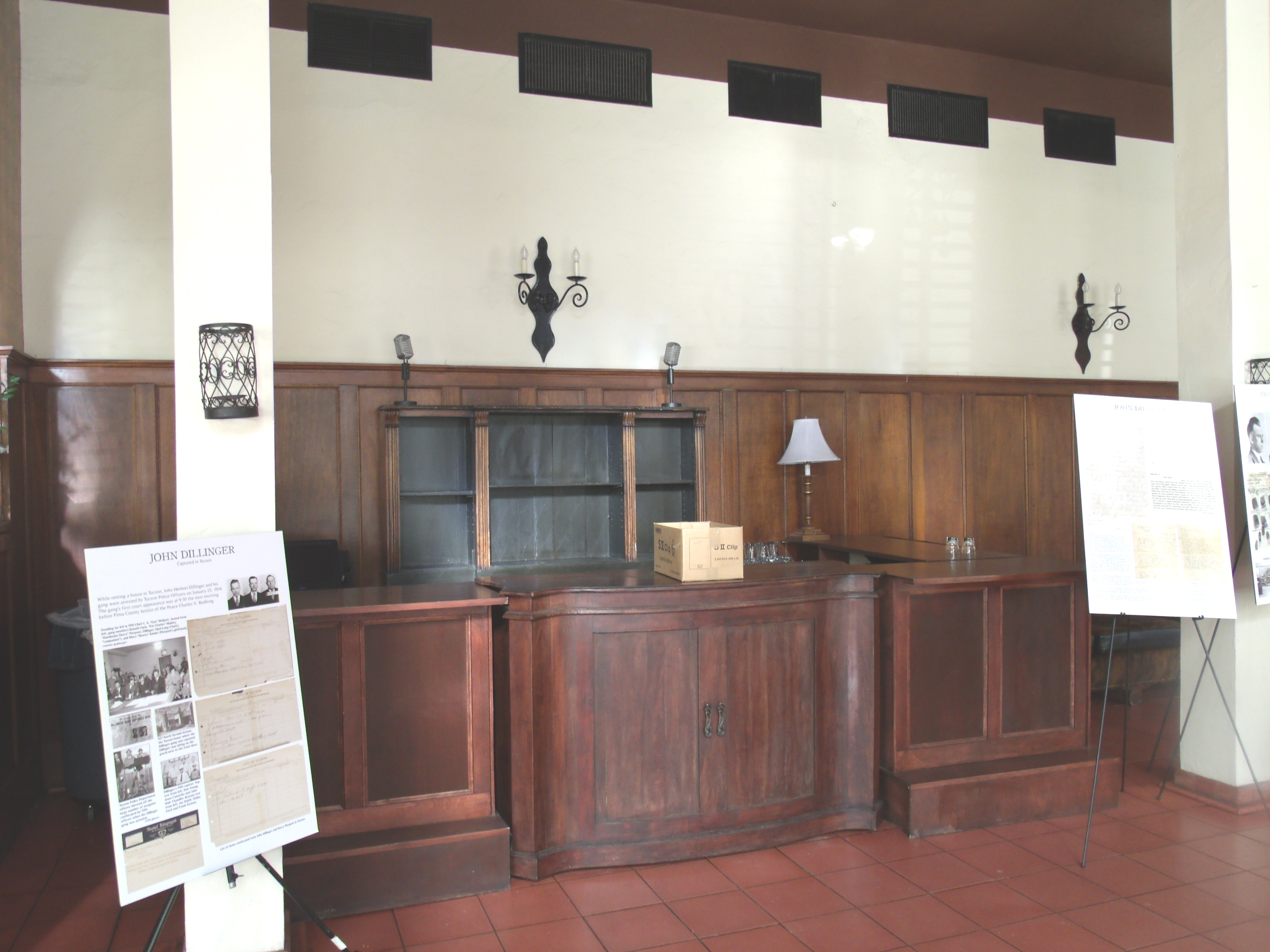
The old lobby of the Hotel Congress associated with John Dillinger

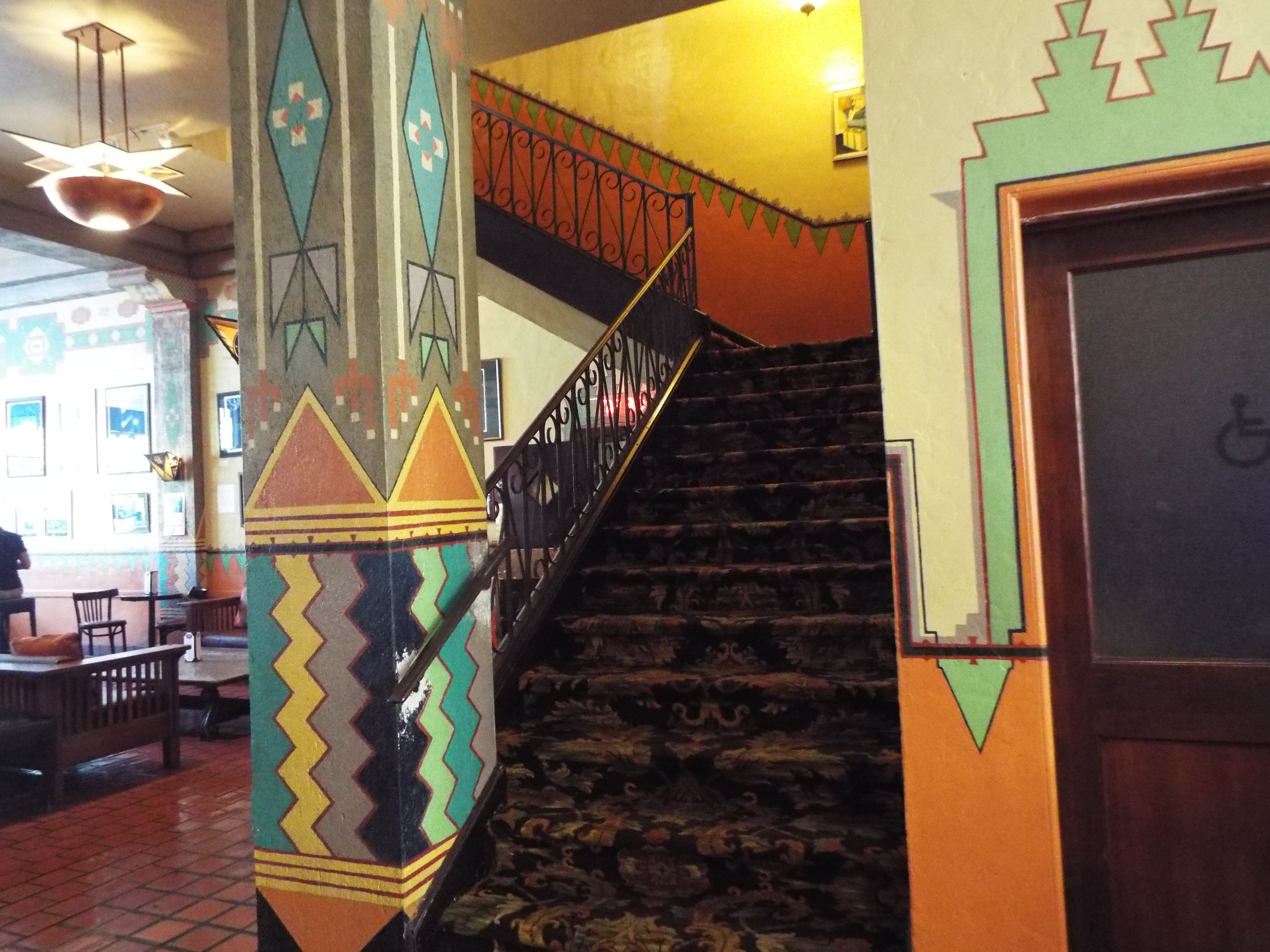
Inside the hotel

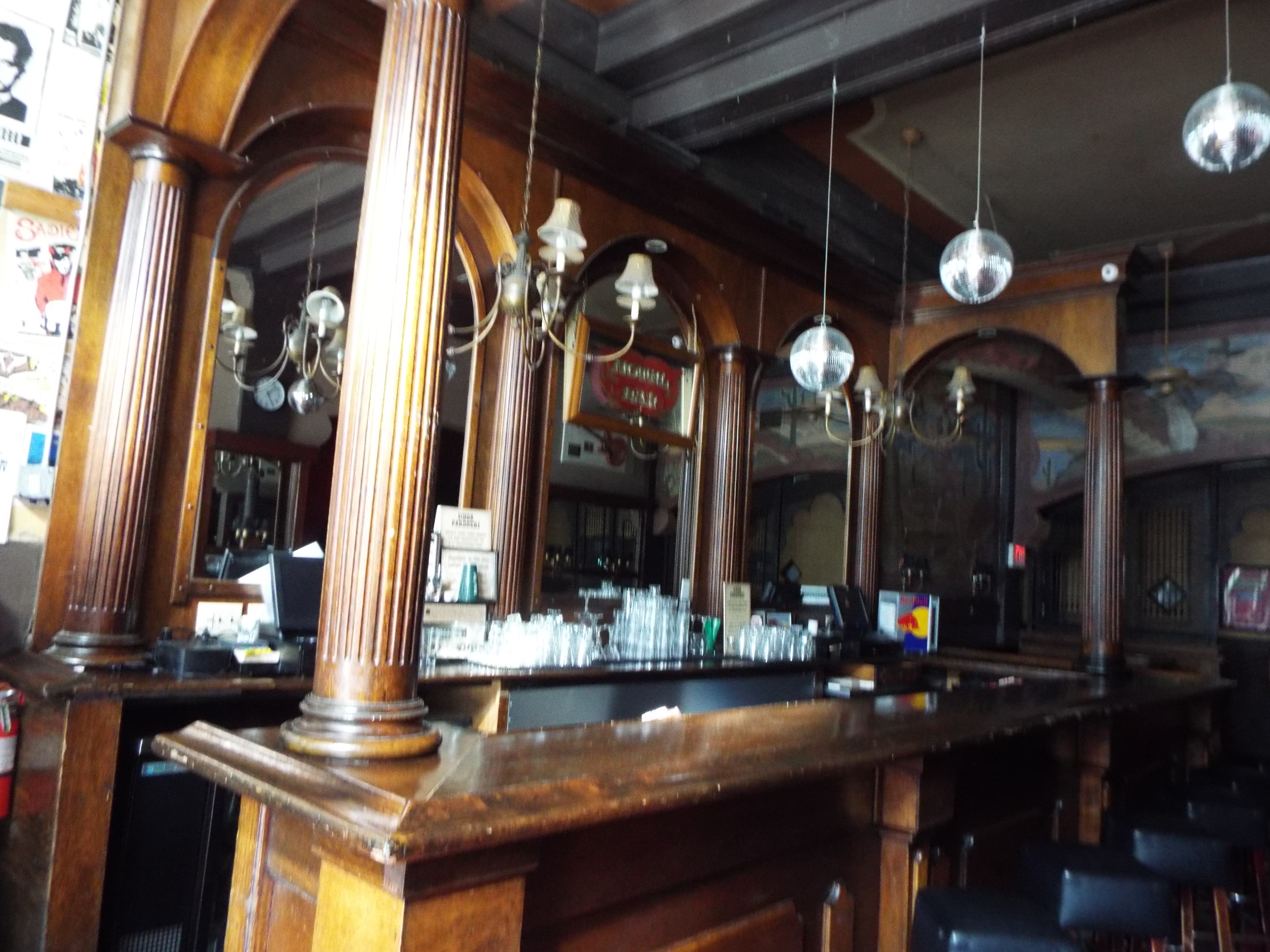
One of the Club Congress hotel bars

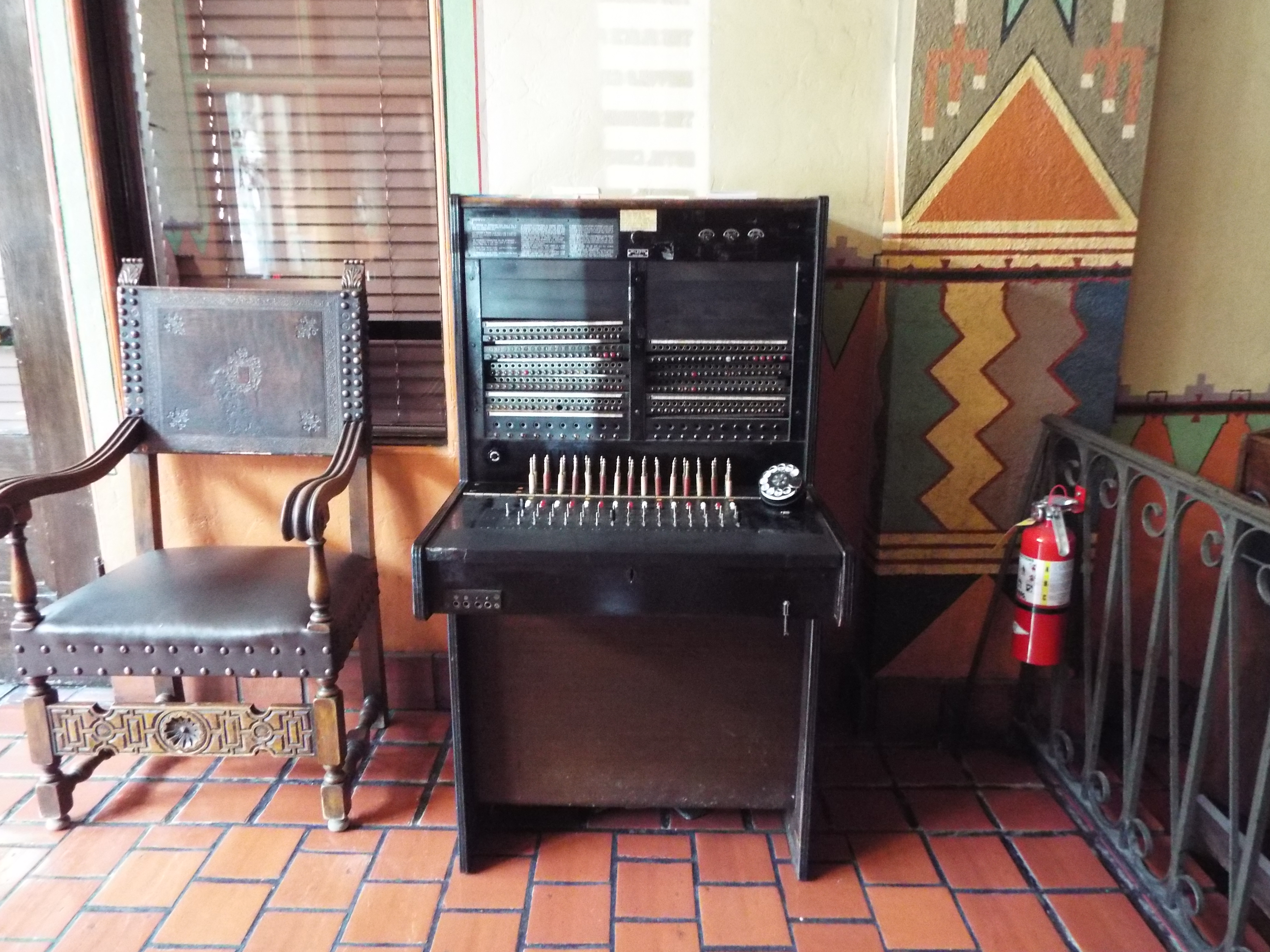
Early hotel switchboard

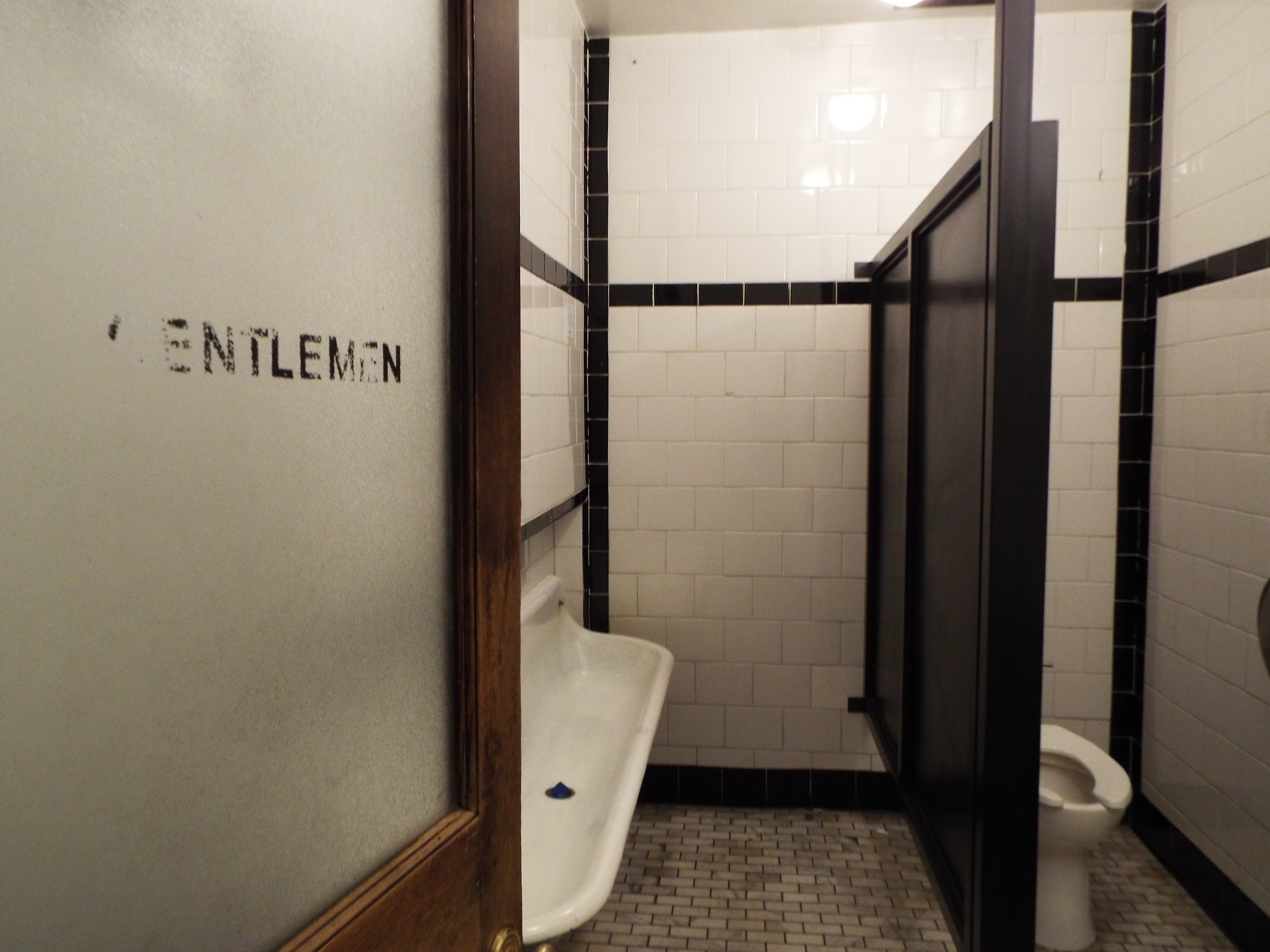
Gentlemen's Restroom

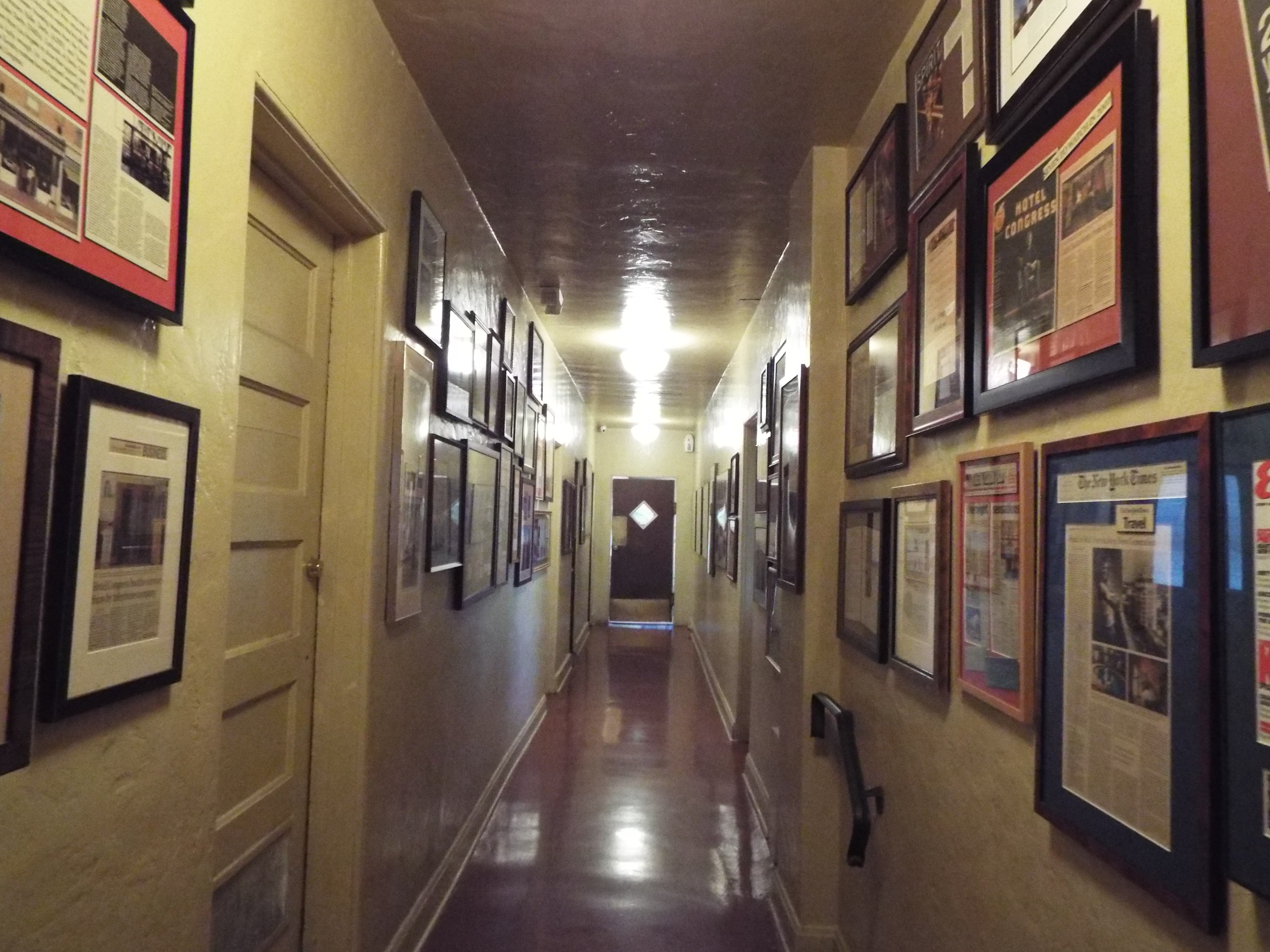
Hotel hallway

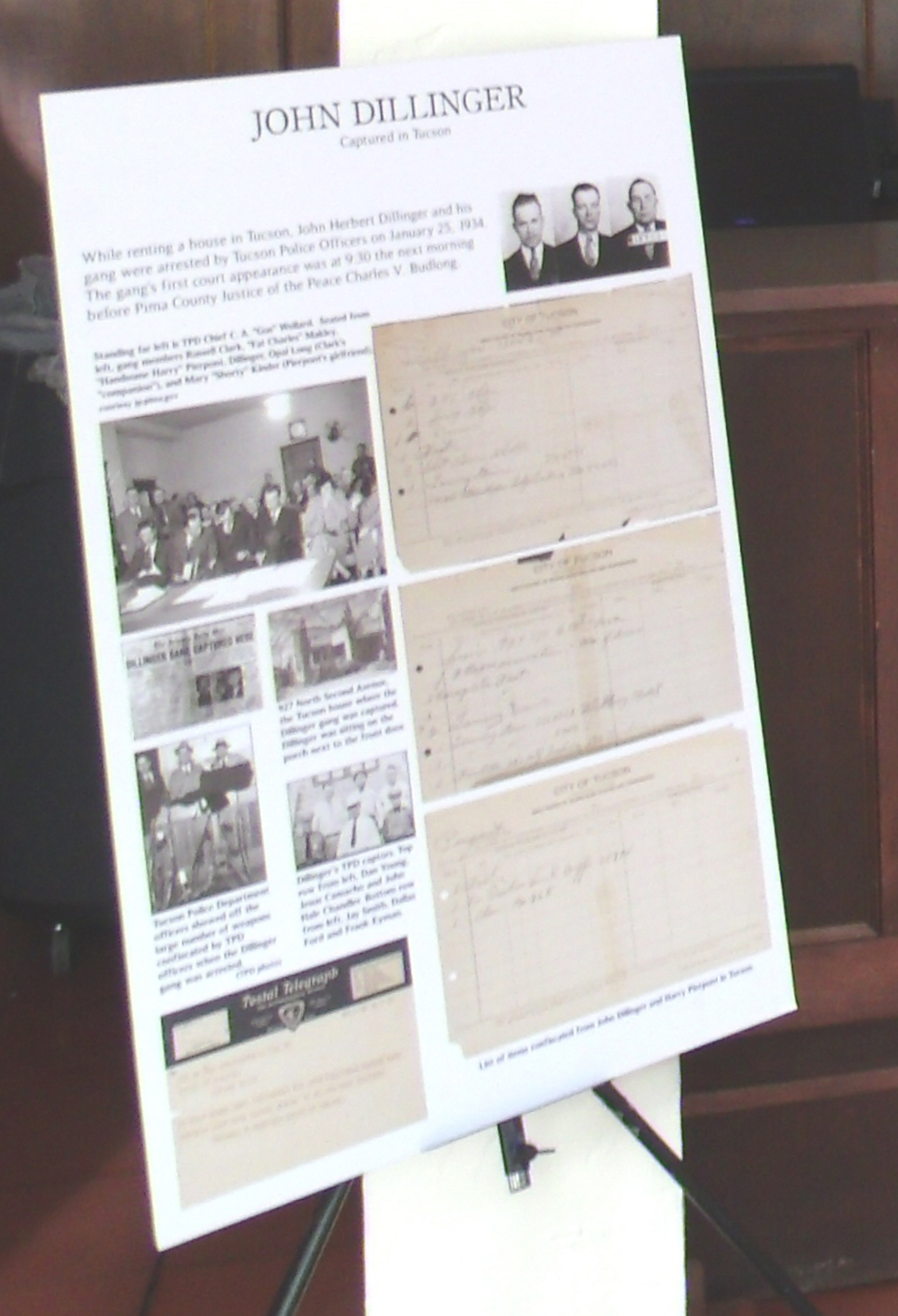
Display of newspaper clippings of the capture of John Dillinger and his gang in the old lobby of the Congress Hotel.

=== John Dillinger Days ===
Hotel Congress has been hosting "John Dillinger Days" since 1994, with an reenactment of the capture of gangster John Dillinger in Tucson. On January 25, 1934, John Dillinger, one of America's most notorious and members of his gang which included Charley Makley, Russell Clark and Harry Pierpont, were apprehended by the Tucson Police Department and the Tucson Fire Department. This incident happened at the Hotel Congress. The following are some of the images of the 2020 reenactment of the historical event which includes images of the historic vehicles which participated.

- A 1930 Ford Model A Police car.
- A restored 1923 American LaFrance Fire Engine which actually was present during the incident on January 25, 1934
- A 1916 American LaFrance Type 17 Tractor Drawn Aerial Ladder.
- A 1928 Ahrens-Fox Fire Engine.
John Dillinger Days 2020

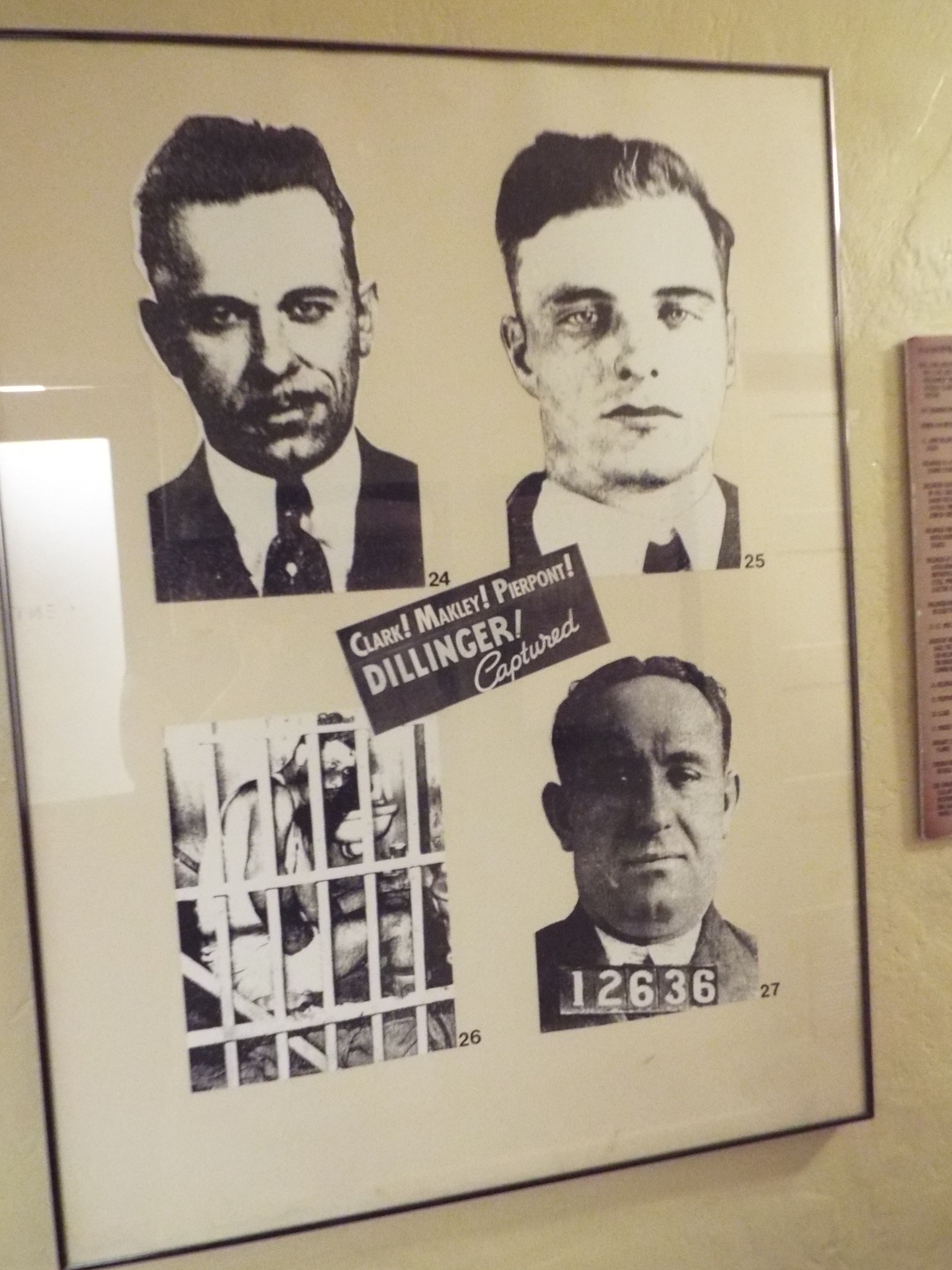
Poster of John Dillinger and two gang members in the hotel hallway

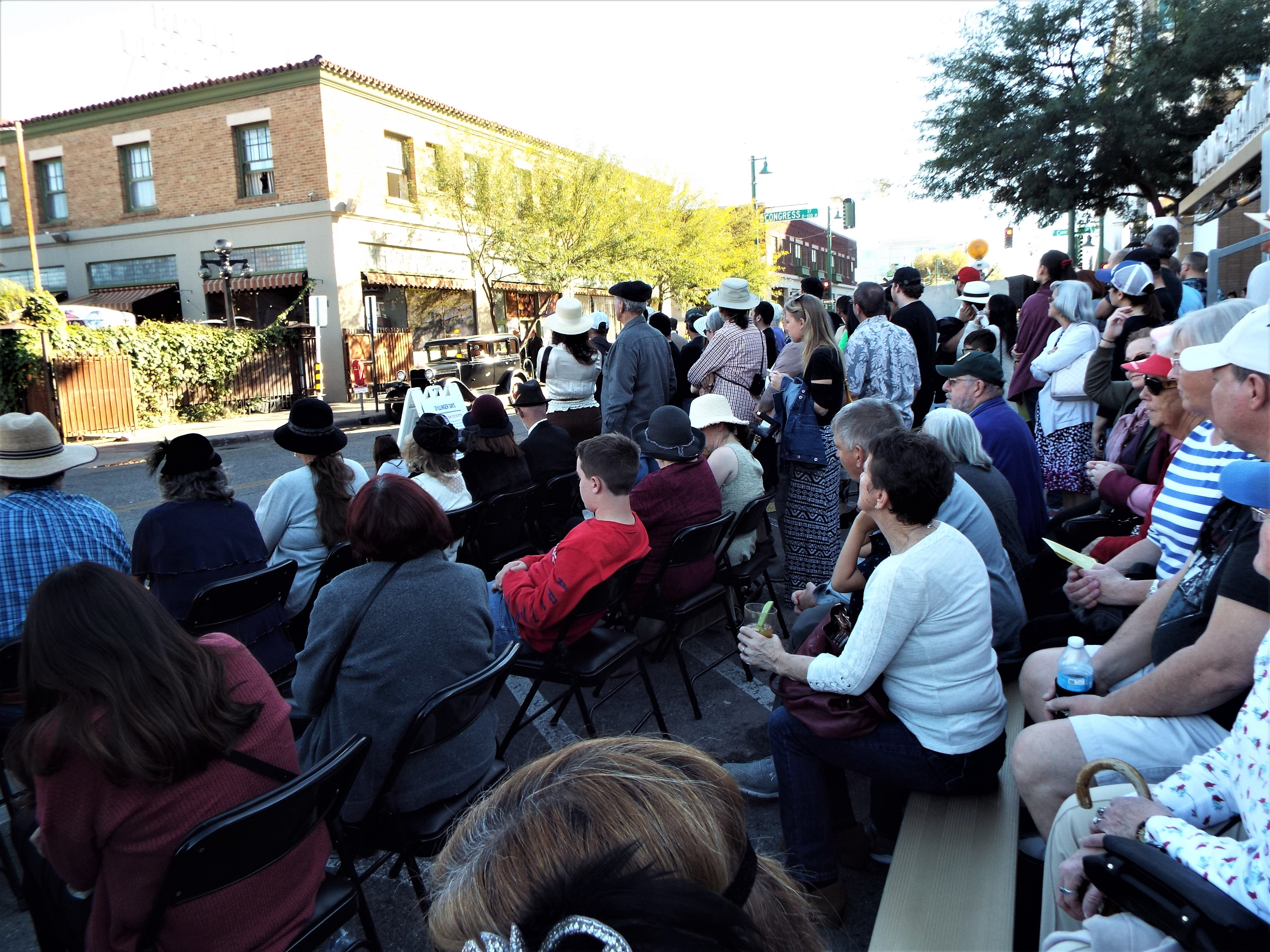
Crowd enjoying the event

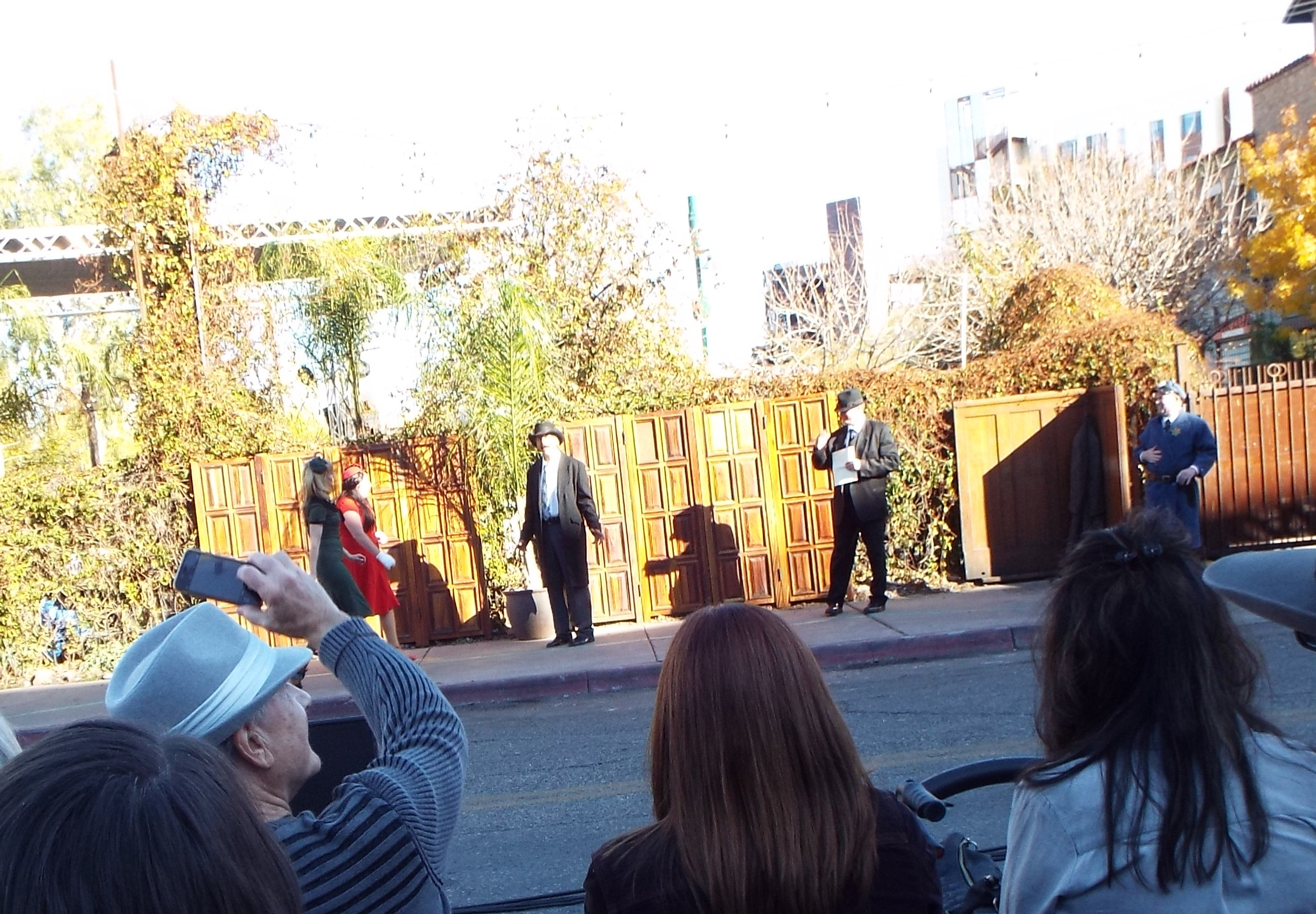
Event actors

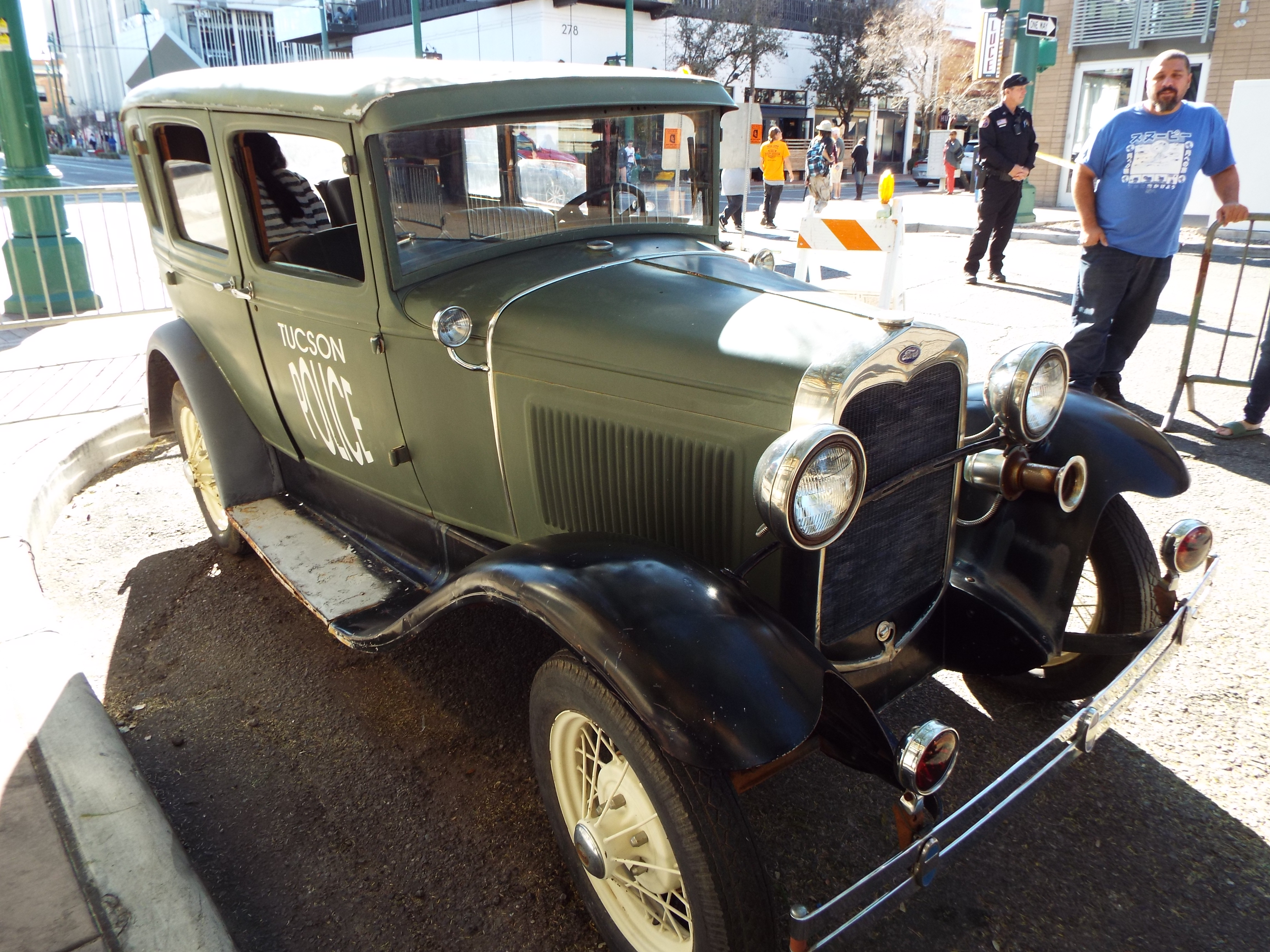
1930 Ford Model A Police car.

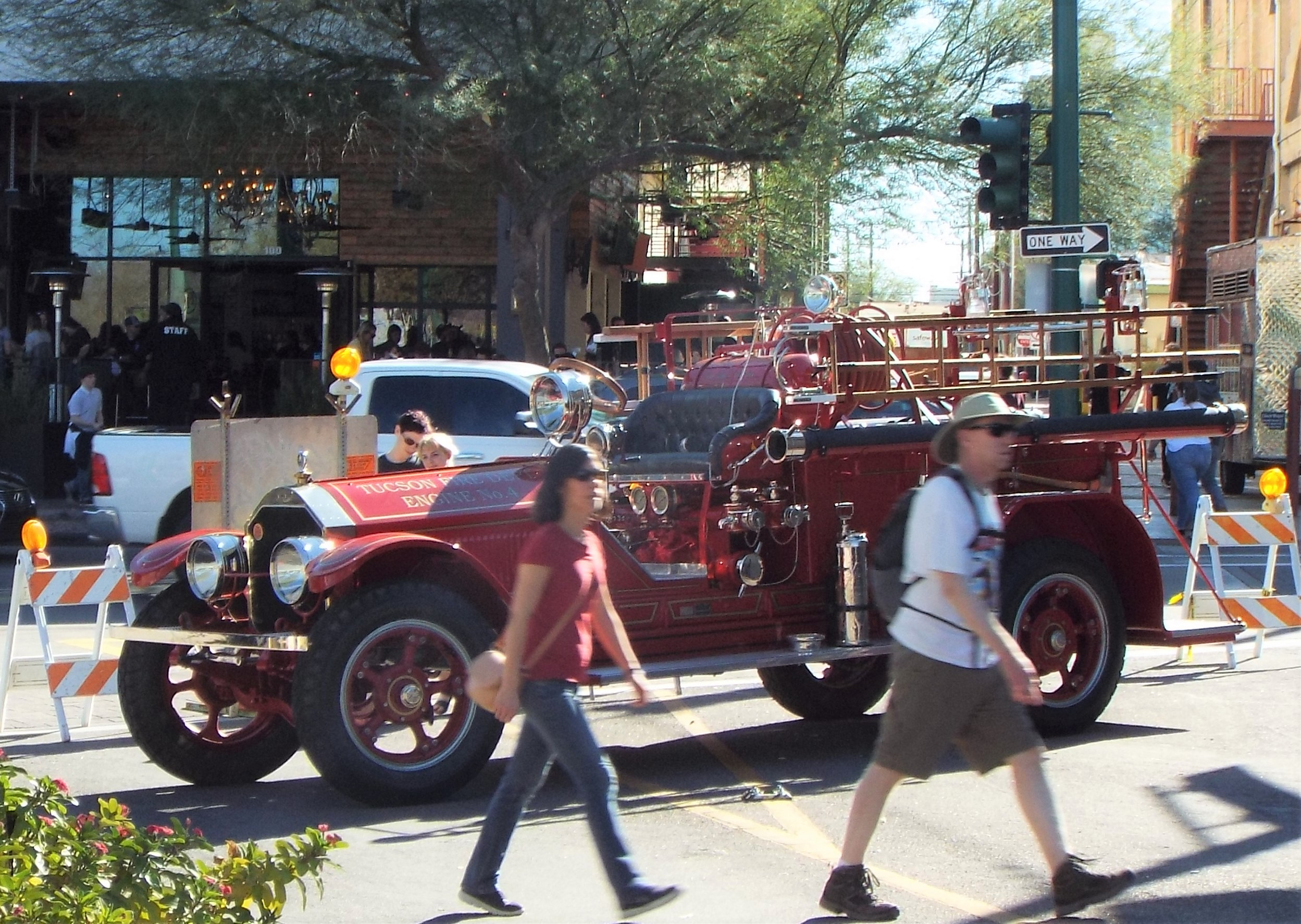
1923 American LaFrance Fire Engine

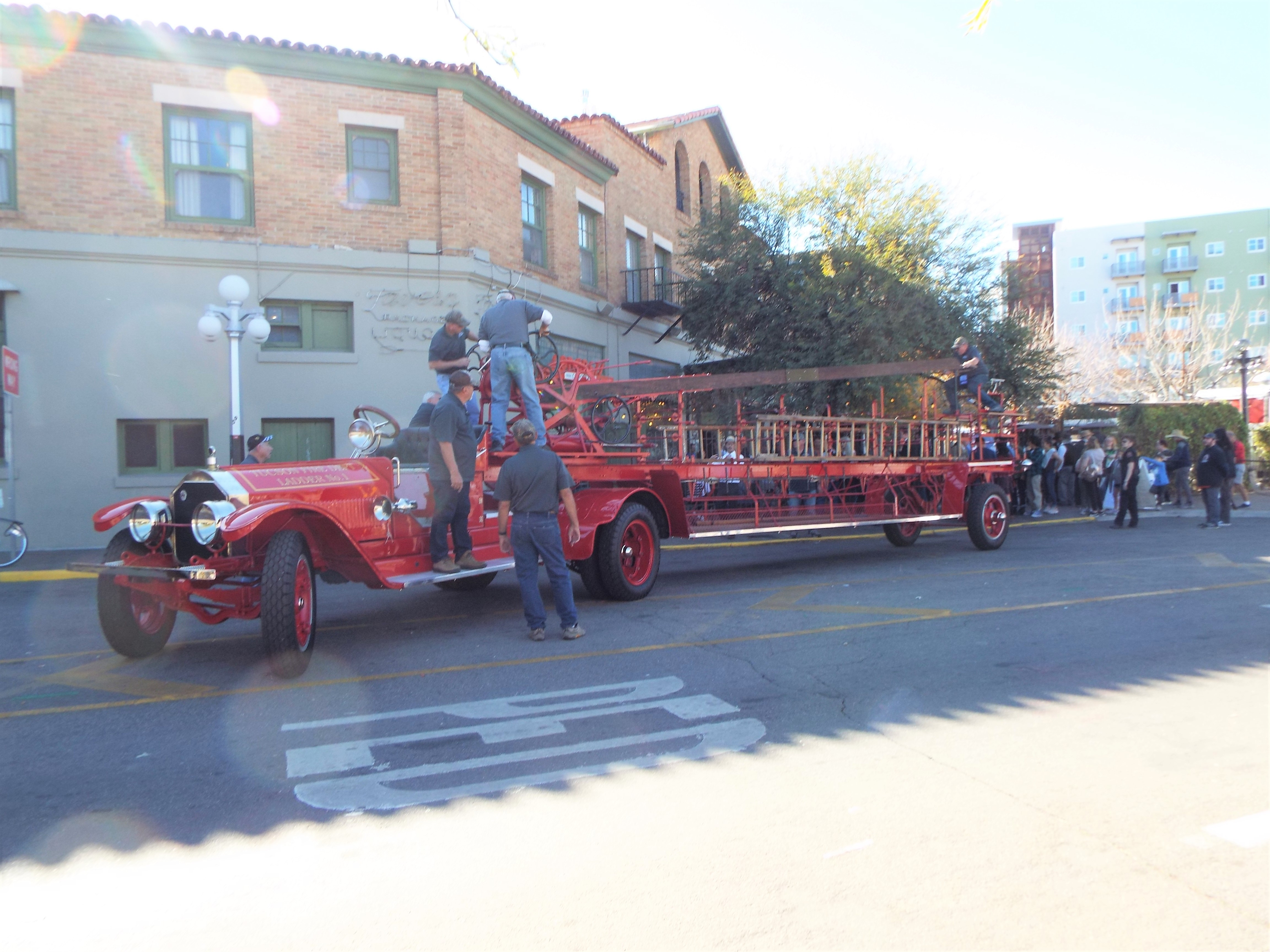
1916 American LaFrance Type 17 Tractor Drawn Aerial Ladder.

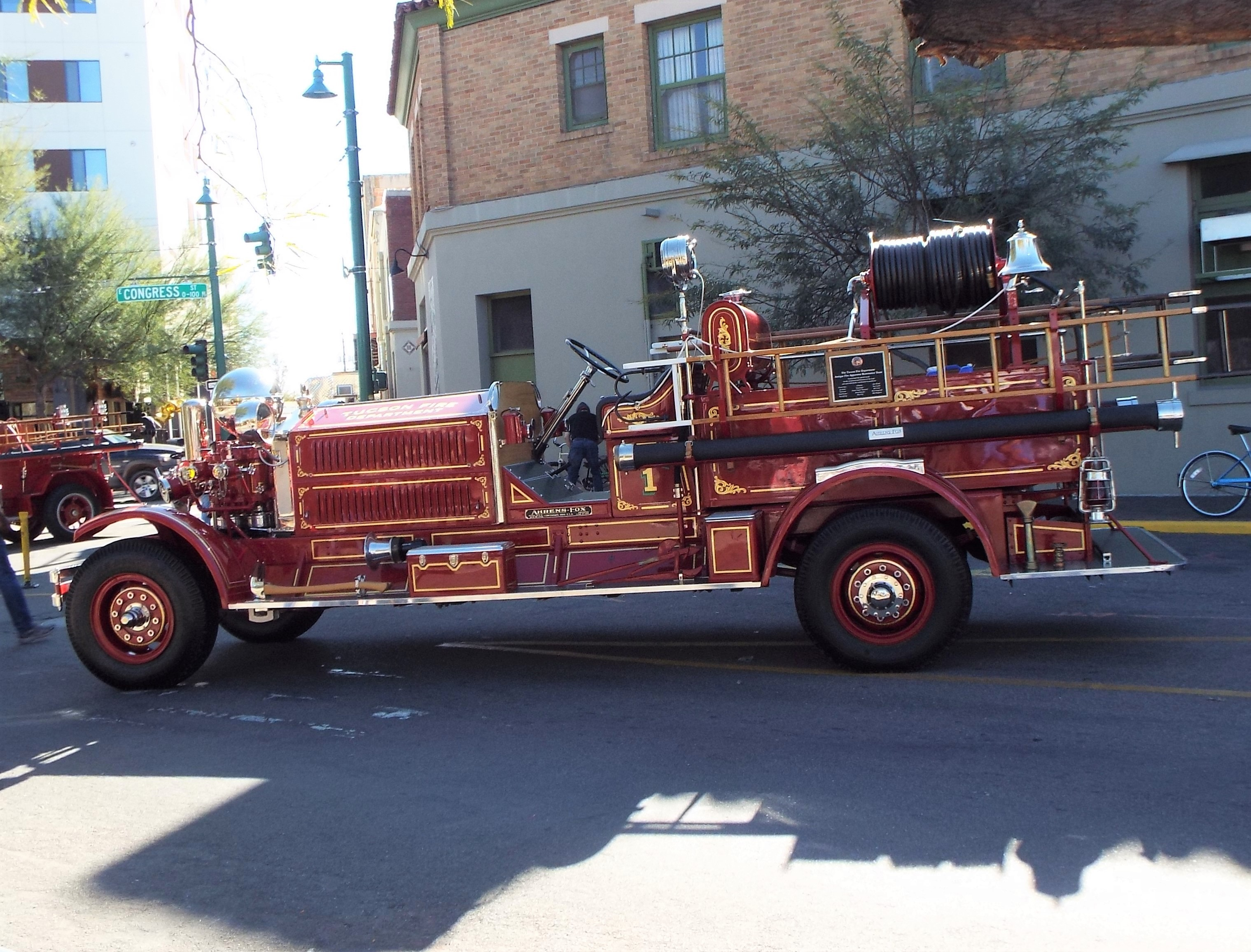
1928 Ahrens-Fox Fire Engine.

=== Underpasses ===
The underpasses considered historical by the National Register of Historic Places are:

- The Fourth Avenue Underpass – located on 4th Ave. and listed in the National Register of Historic Places on September 30, 1988, reference: #88001654.
- The Sixth Avenue Underpass – located on 6th Ave. and listed in the National Register of Historic Places on September 30, 1988, reference: #88001655.
- The Stone Avenue Underpass – located on Stone Avenue and listed in the National Register of Historic Places on September 30, 1988, reference: #88001656.
Historic underpases
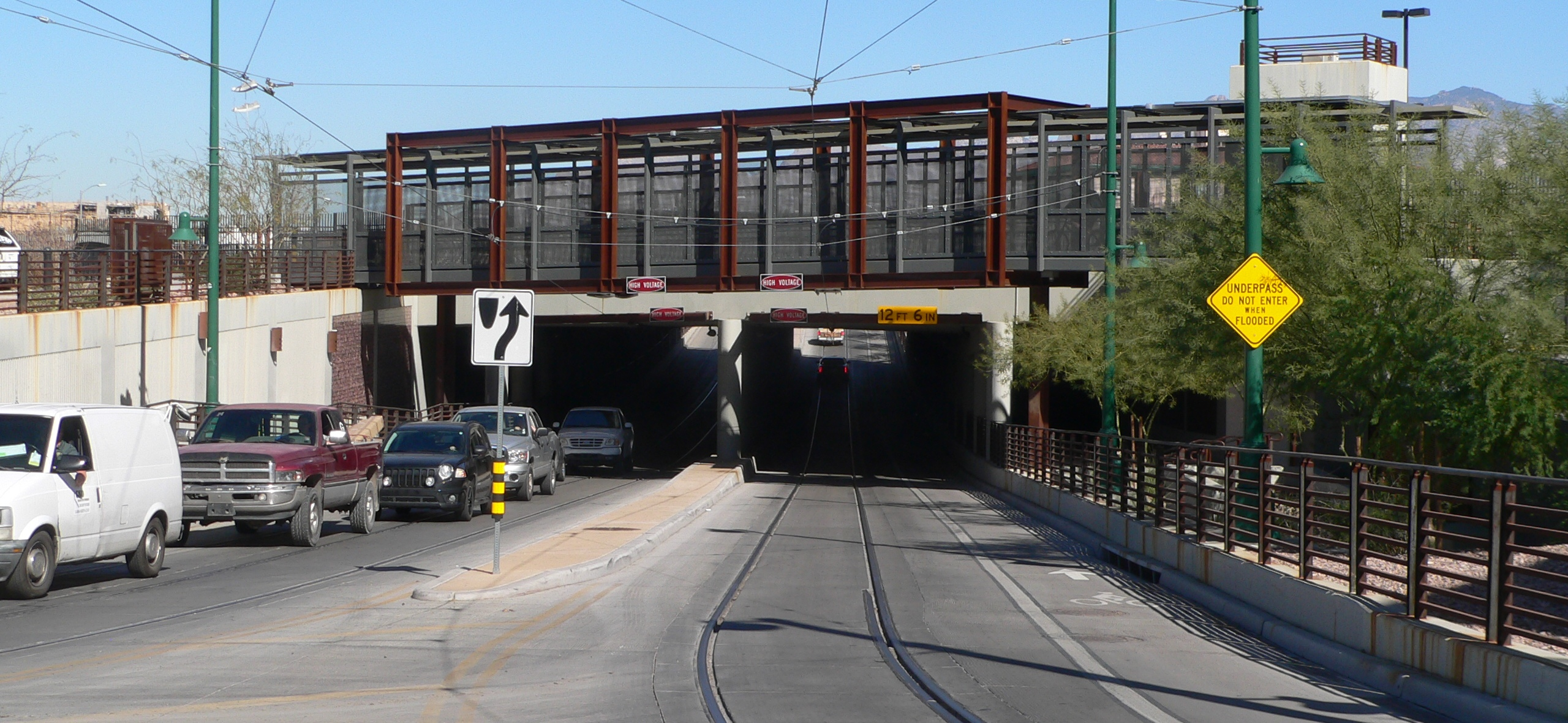
4th. Avenue Underpass.

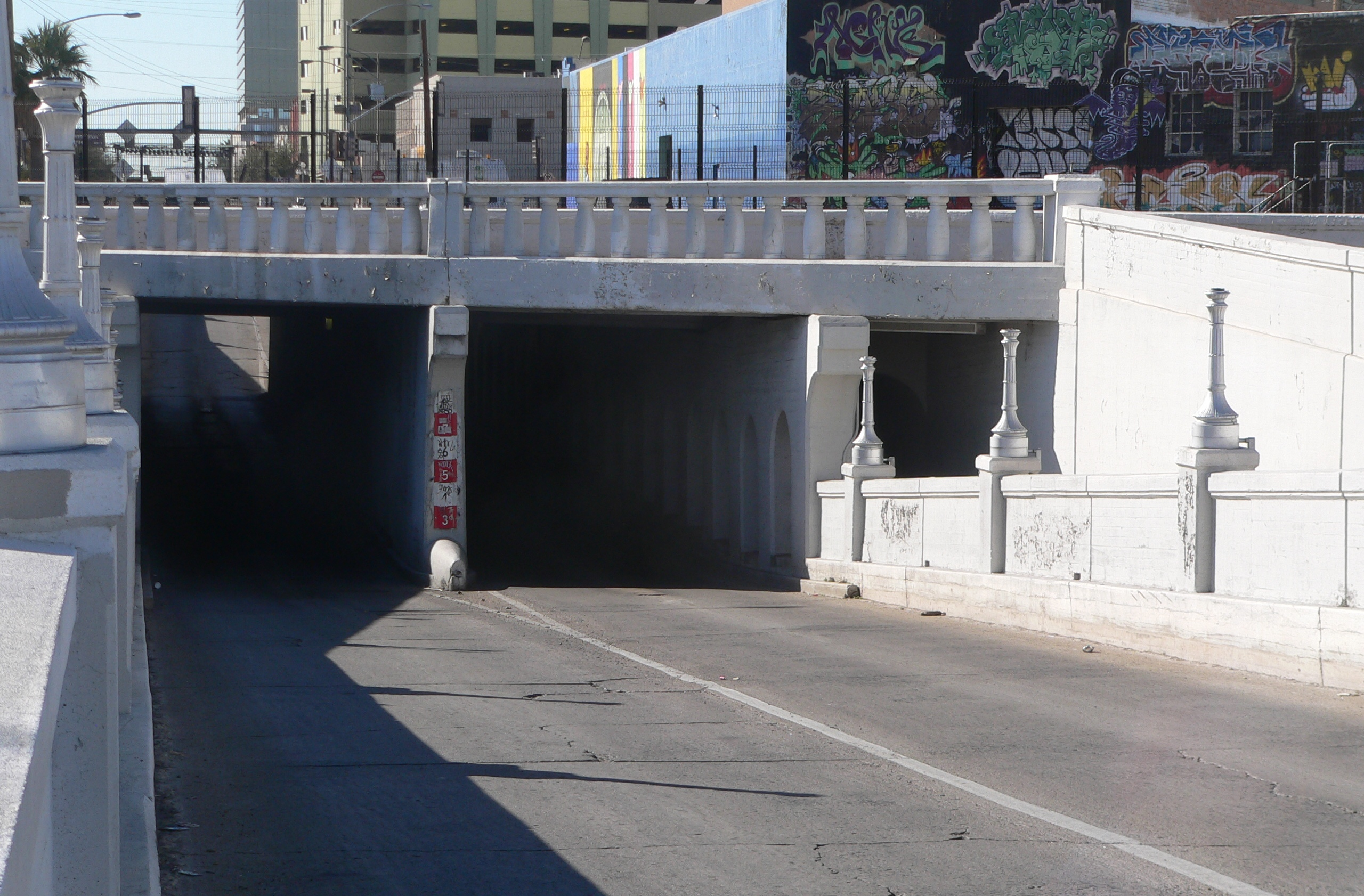
6th. Avenue Underpass.

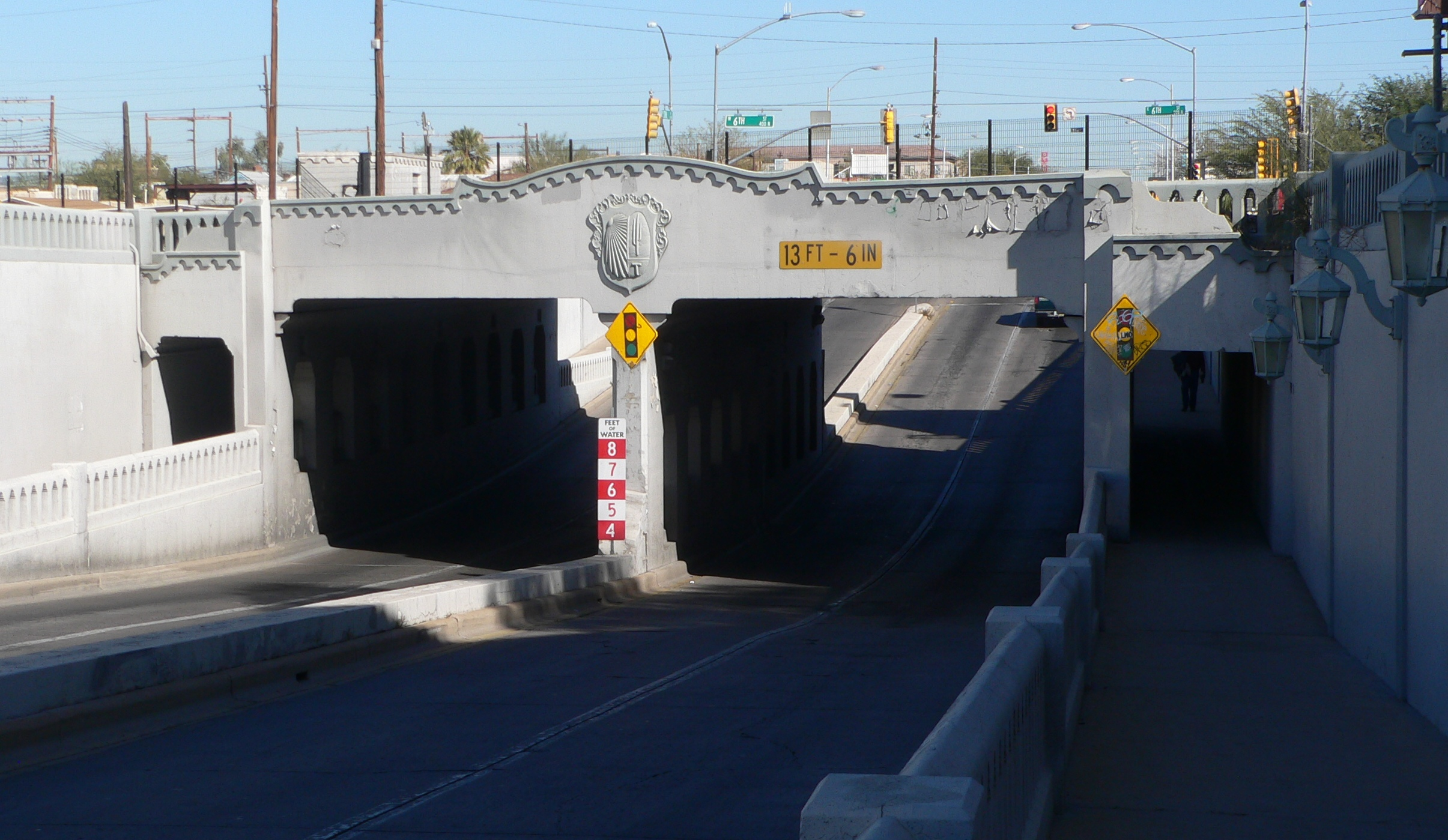
Stone Avenue Underpass.

=== Historic houses ===
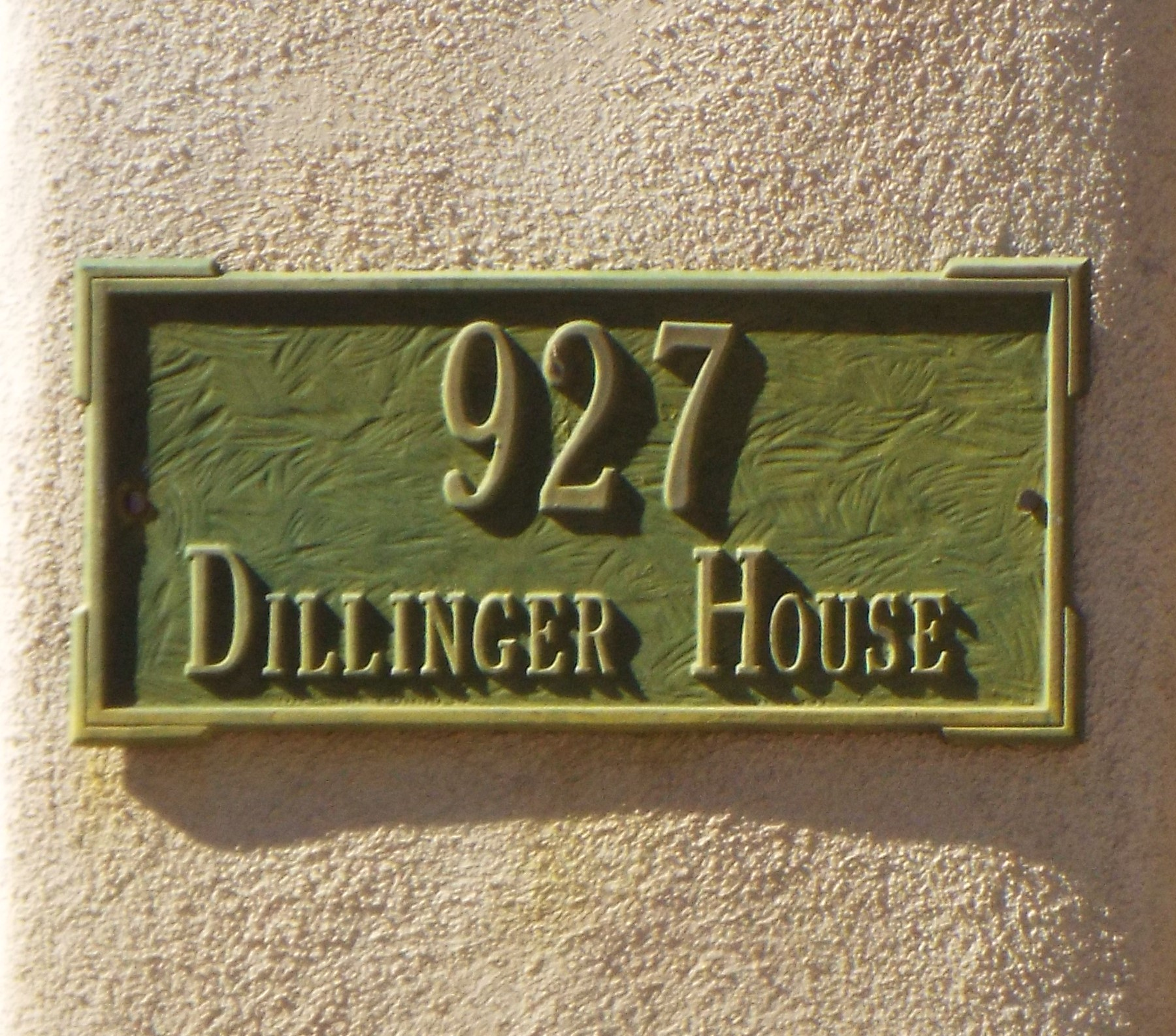
The John Dillinger House

The houses in Tucson of historical significanse which are listed in the National Register of Historic Places and which are pictured are the following:

- The Ronstadt House – built in 1904 and located at 607 N. 6th Ave. The House was designed and built for Fredrick Ronstadt, a Tucson pioneer, wagon maker, hardware company owner, and Tucson's first automobile dealer. It was listed in the National Register of Historic Places on February 26, 1979, reference: #79000423.
- The Blixt-Avitia House – built in 1923 and located at 830 W. Alameda St. March 30, 1992, reference: #92000251.
- The Boudreaux-Robison House – built in 1908 and located at 101 N. Bella Vista Dr. It was listed in the National Register of Historic Places on March 30, 1992, reference: #92000253.
- The Bray-Valenzuela House – built in 1917 and located at 203 N. Grande Ave. March 30, 1992, reference: #92000255.
- The Dr. William Austin Cannon House – built in 1906 and located at 1189 E. Speedway. The house was built for Professor William Austin. Cannon, was a noted botanist who came to Tucson to work at the newly founded Carnegie Desert Laboratory at Tumamoc Hill. It was listed in the National Register of Historic Places on October 25, 1982, reference: #82001663.
- The Cordova House – built in 1848 and located at 173-177 N. Meyer Ave. May 4, 1972, reference: #72000198.
- The Dodson-Esquivel House – built in 1921 and located at 1004 W. Alameda St. It was listed in the National Register of Historic Places on March 30, 1992, reference: #92000252.
- The Drexel House – located at 5535 N. Camino Real. It was listed in the National Register of Historic Places on June 26, 2017, reference: #100001231.
- The First Joesler House – built in 1927 and located at 3408 E. Fairmount St.. Josias Thomas Joesler was an architect and engineer born in Zurich, Switzerland. In 1927, he moved to Tucson where the Murphey-Keith Building Company provided Joesler with 56 jobs. The house was listed in the National Register of Historic Places on September 9, 2010, reference: #10000741.
- The Gabel House – located at 5445 N. Camino Escuela. It was listed in the National Register of Historic Places on September 9, 2010, reference: #10000742.
- The Gist Residence – located at 5626 E. Burns St. It was listed in the National Register of Historic Places on December 4, 2009, reference: #09000960.
- The Arthur C. and Helen Neel Hall House – located at 4875 N. Campbell Ave. Arthur C. Hall played a major role in the development of the Mission Mine Complex South of Tucson. Following his retirement he lectured at the University of Arizona on management. He was among the first members of the Board of Directors of the Arizona-Sonora Desert Museum. It was listed in the National Register of Historic Places on August 30, 2011, reference: #11000571.
- The Lewis D.W. Hall House – located at 3160 E. Via Celeste. It was listed in the National Register of Historic Places on August 30, 2011, reference: #11000572.
- The Hecker House – located at 2635 N. Camino Principal. It was listed in the National Register of Historic Places on September 9, 2010, reference: #10000744.
- The Manning Cabin – built in 1905 and located at 10 miles (16 km) east of Tucson in the Saguaro National Park. It was listed in the National Register of Historic Places on March 31, 1975, reference: #75000169.
- The Levi H. Manning House – built in 1907 and located at 9 Paseo Redondo. Manning served as mayor of Tucson from 1905 to 1907. He was elected on an anti-gambling platform. He was also involved with real estate, the mining industry, the Santa Rita Hotel, a merchandising business, the gas and electric company as well as the streetcar company. He was one of the largest property holders in Tucson. President Grover Cleveland appointed him Surveyor-General. The house was listed in the National Register of Historic Places on July 27, 1979, reference: #79000421.
- The Charles O. Brown house – built in 1876 and located at 40 W. Broadway. Listed as "The Old Adobe Patio", the Charles 0. Brown House is one of Tucson's oldest territorial houses. The house was listed in the National Register of Historic Places on June 3, 1971, reference: #71000117.
- The Ramada House – located at 2801 E Camino Norberto. It was listed in the National Register of Historic Places on September 24, 2006, reference: #06000832.
- The Schwalen-Gomez House – built in 1905 and located at 217 N. Melwood Ave. It was listed in the National Register of Historic Places on March 30, 1992, reference: #92000250.
- The Professor George E. P. Smith House – built in 1904 and located at 1195 E. Speedway. George Edson Philip Smith, was both Professor of Irrigation Engineering and head of the Agricultural Engineering Department of the University of Arizona. Smith revolutionized the field of water resources. He was an authority on irrigation and a pioneer in the development of the underground and surface waters of the state of Arizona. The house was listed in the National Register of Historic Places on June 3, 1982, reference: #82002090.
- The Sosa–Carrillo–Fremont House – built in 1858 and located at 145-153 S. Main Street. The house was originally listed on the National Register as the John Charles Fremont, Casa del Gobernador, House in 1971, because it once served as the residence of John Charles Frémont, former Territorial Governor of Artizona. It was listed in the National Register of Historic Places on June 3, 1971, reference: #71000116.
- The Charles S. Todd House – built in 1941 and located at 11511 and located at E. Speedway Boulevard. It was listed in the National Register of Historic Places on January 26, 2001, reference: #00001673.
- The Type A at 2101 E. Water St. – located at 2101 E. Water St. It was listed in the National Register of Historic Places on September 9, 2010, reference: #10000745.
- The Type B at 2019 E. Water St. – located at 2019 E. Water St. It was listed in the National Register of Historic Places on September 9, 2010, reference: #10000746.
- The Nellie Mae Kellogg Van Schaick House – built in 1953 and located at 4141 N. Pontatoc Rd. Mrs. Nellie Kellogg Van Schaik was a survivor of internment in a Japanese prison camp in the Philippines in WW II and niece of the man who founded the Kellogg cereal fortune. It was listed in the National Register of Historic Places on August 30, 2011, reference: #11000575.
- The Carlos Ygnacio Velasco House – built in 1878 and located at 471-475-477 S. Stone Ave. and located at 522 S. Russell St. Carlos Ygnacio Velasco was publisher of El Fronterizo, Tucson's first Spanish-language newspaper. It was listed in the National Register of Historic Places on March 5, 1974, reference: #74000460.
- The Solomon Warner House and Mill – built in 1874 and located at 350 S. Grand Ave. In 1856, Solomon Warner became the first American business trader to permanently occupy Tucson and sell American goods. It was listed in the National Register of Historic Places on June 3, 1976, reference: #76000380.
- The John Dillinger House – built in 1925 and located at 927 N. Second Avenue. This is the house that John Dillinger, the infamous gangster, rented and was arrested by the Tucson Police in 1934. Thus the house is now known as the John Dillinger House.
- The Aggie House built in 1930 and located at 819 N Euclid Ave. The Aggie House was founded in 1937, with the purpose of allowing men attending the University of Arizona to live at an affordable cost while pursuing a degree in agriculture.
Historic houses

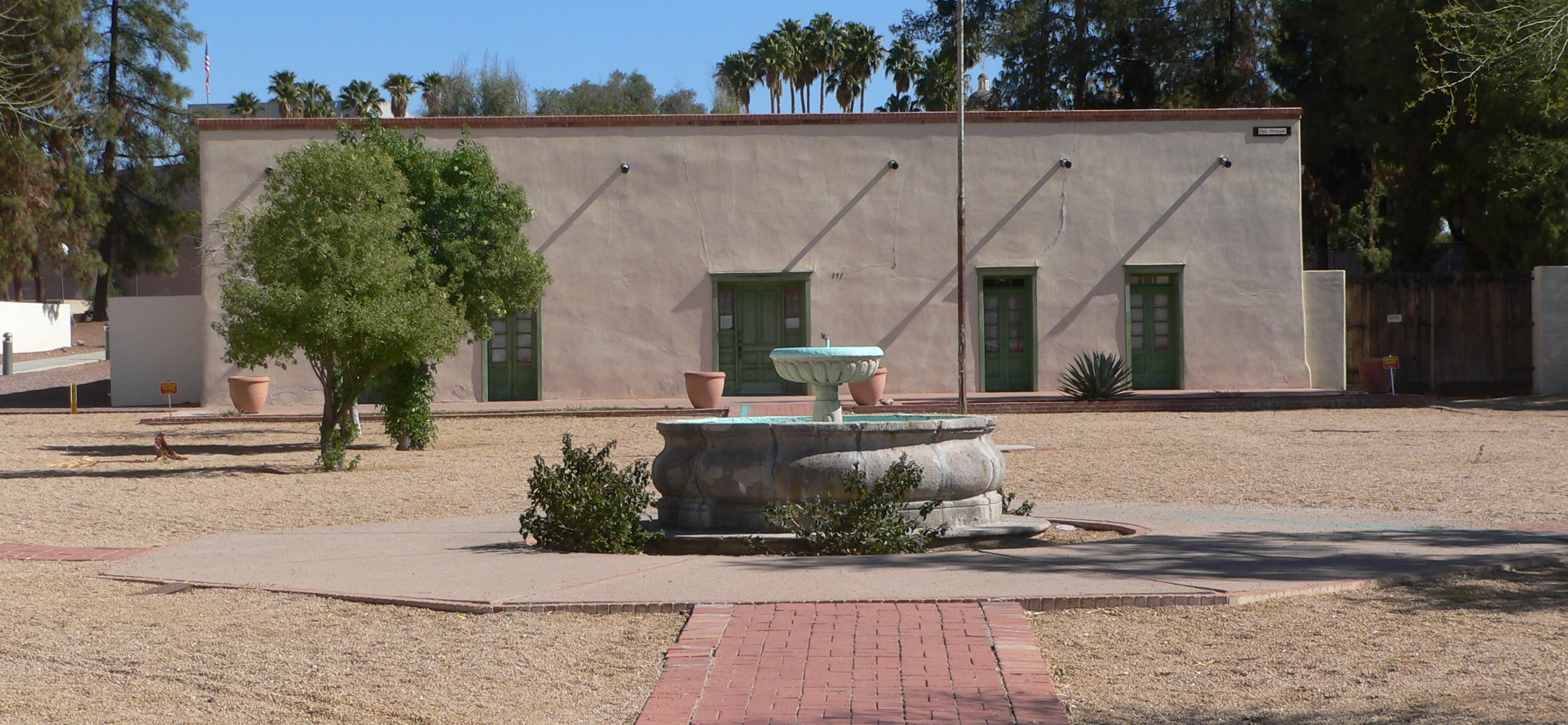
The Sosa-Carillo-Fremont house

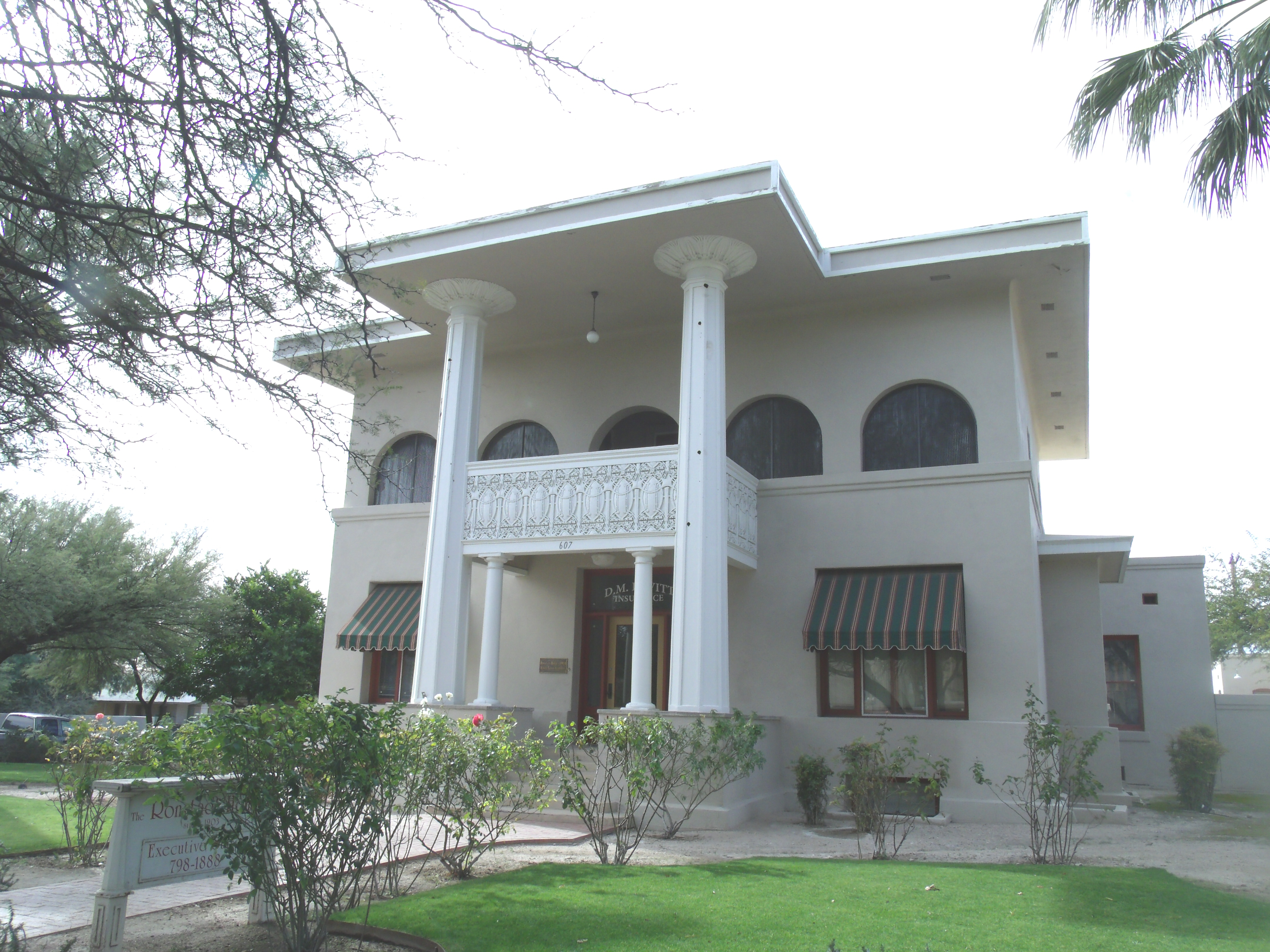
The Ronstadt House.

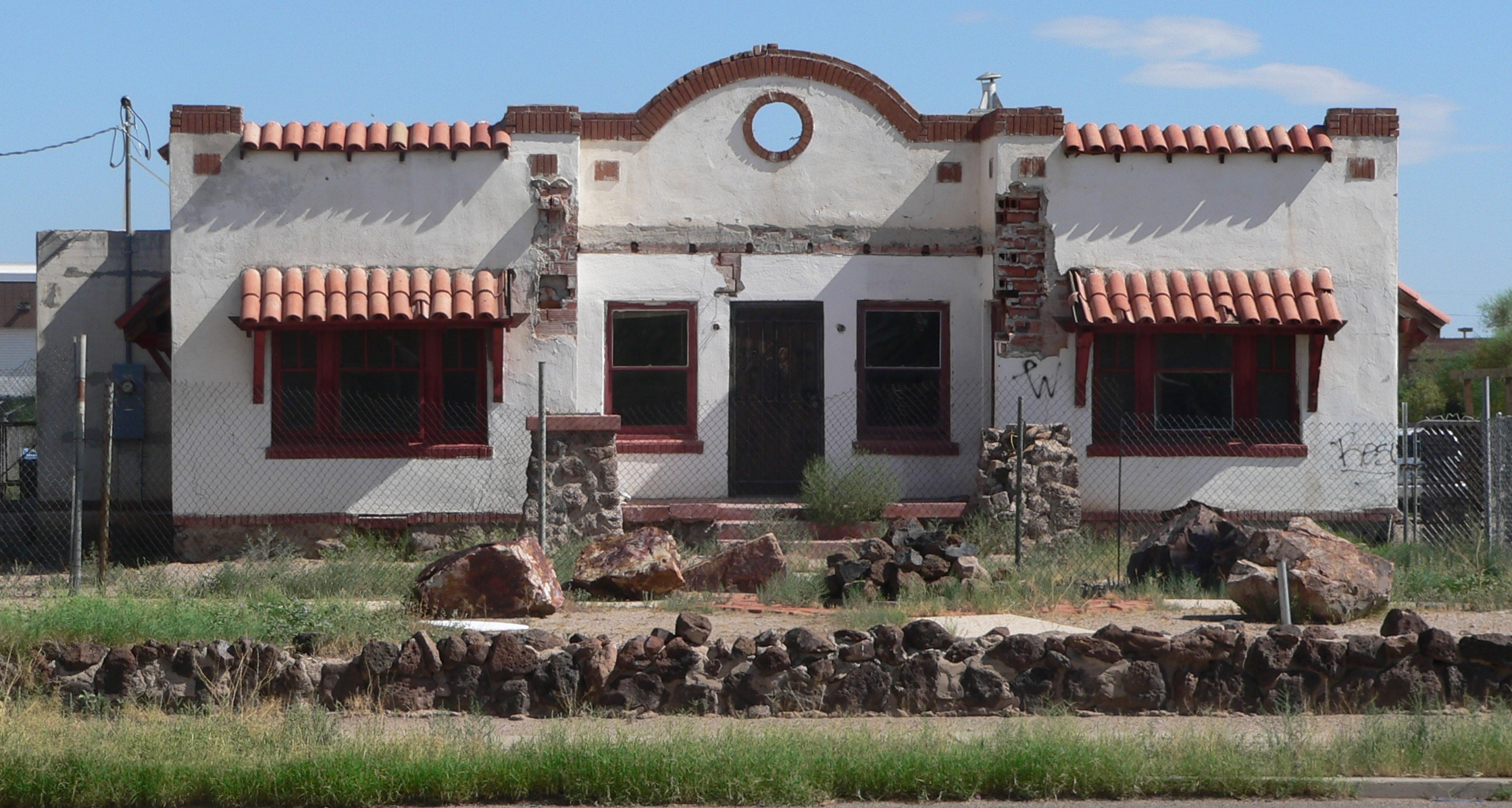
The Blixt-Avitia House.

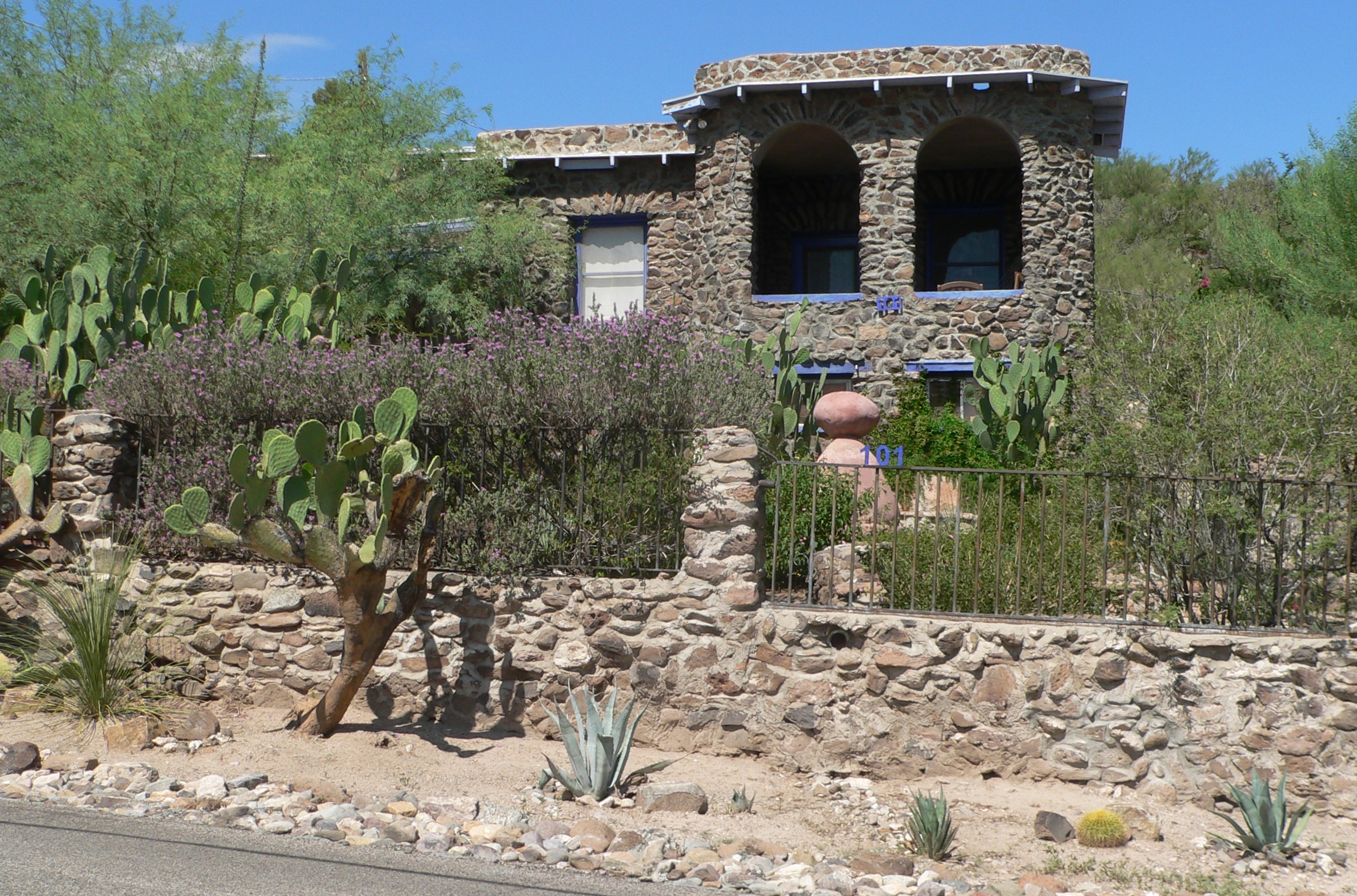
The Boudreaux-Robison House.

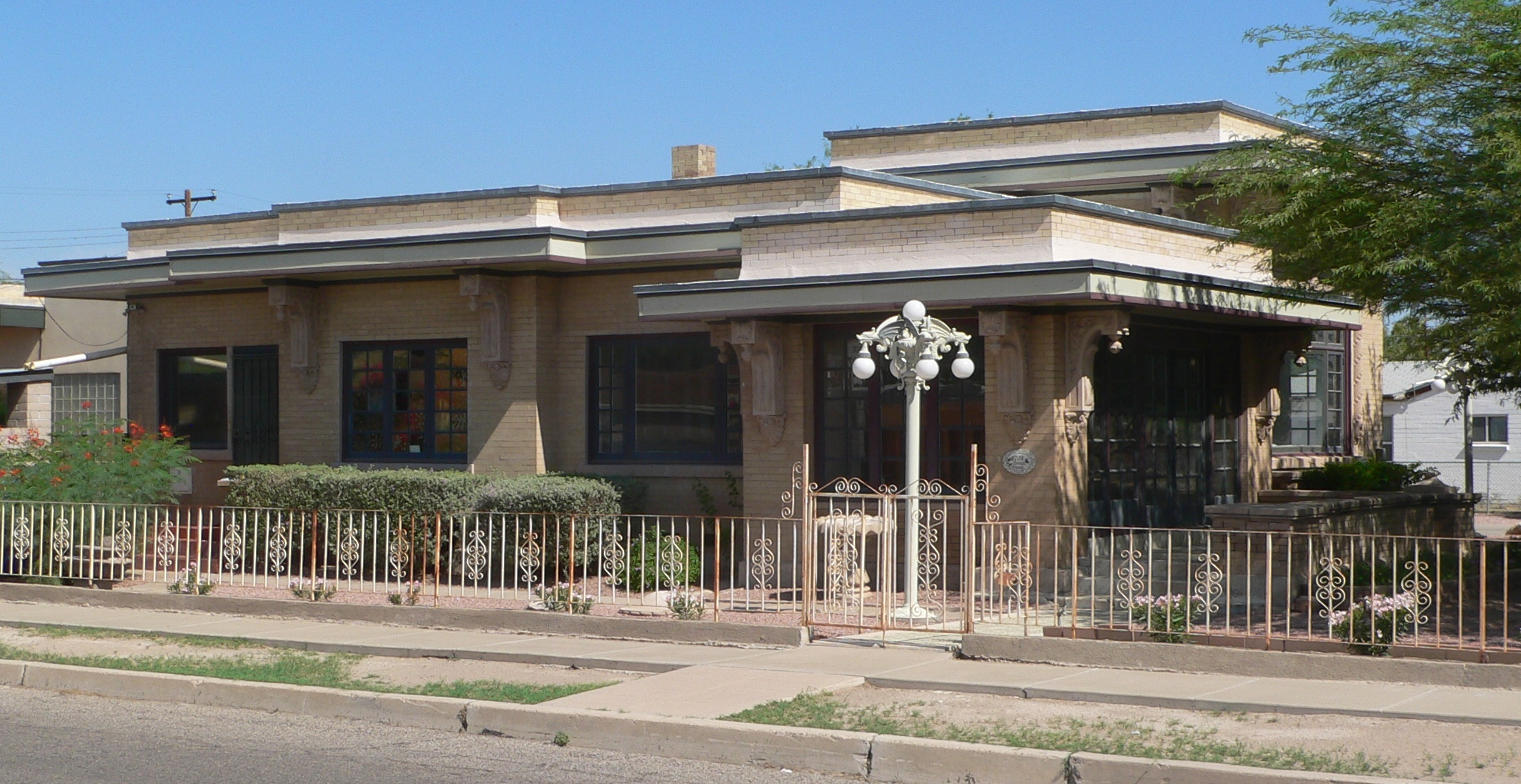
The Bray-Valenzuela House.

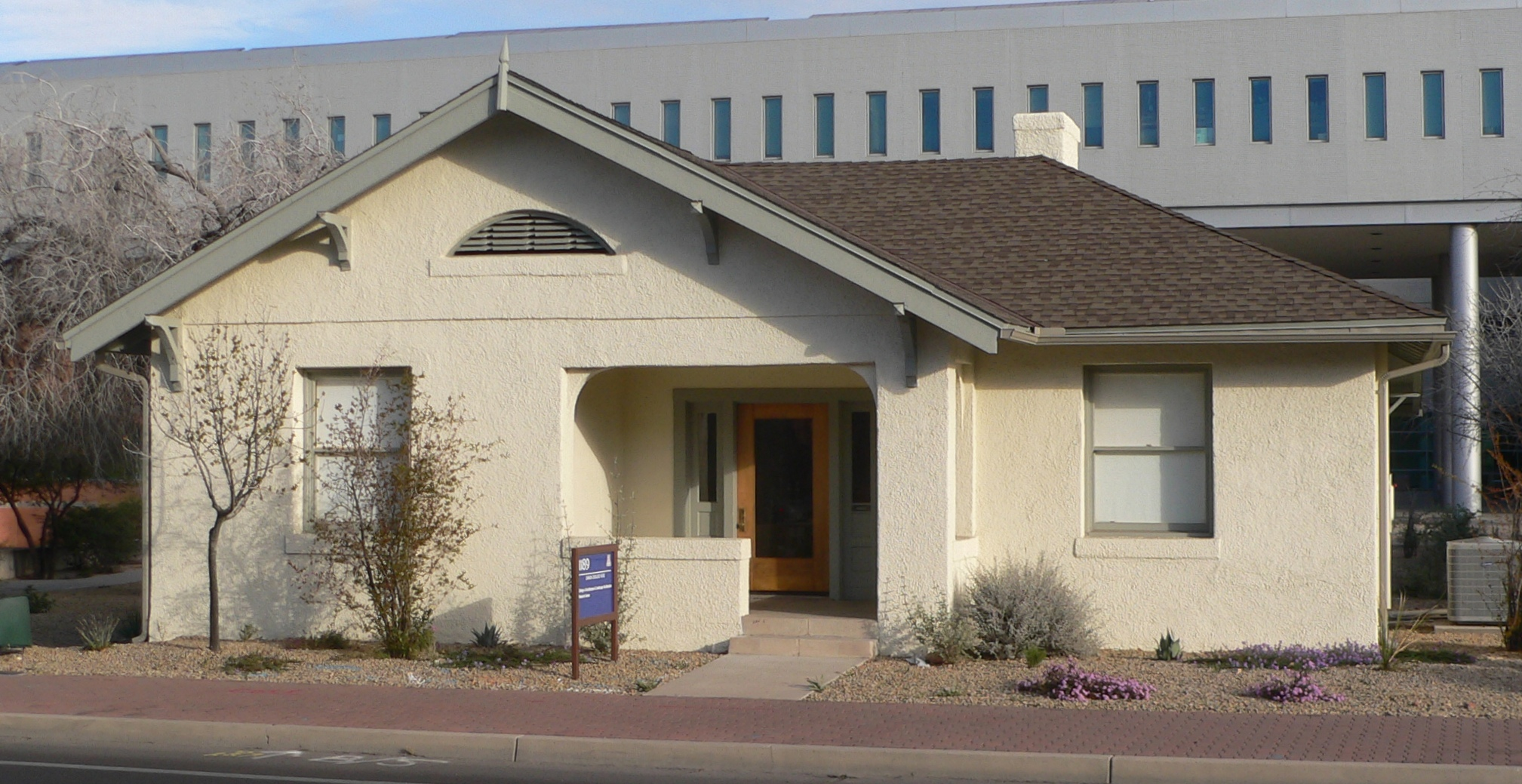
The Dr. William Austin Cannon House.

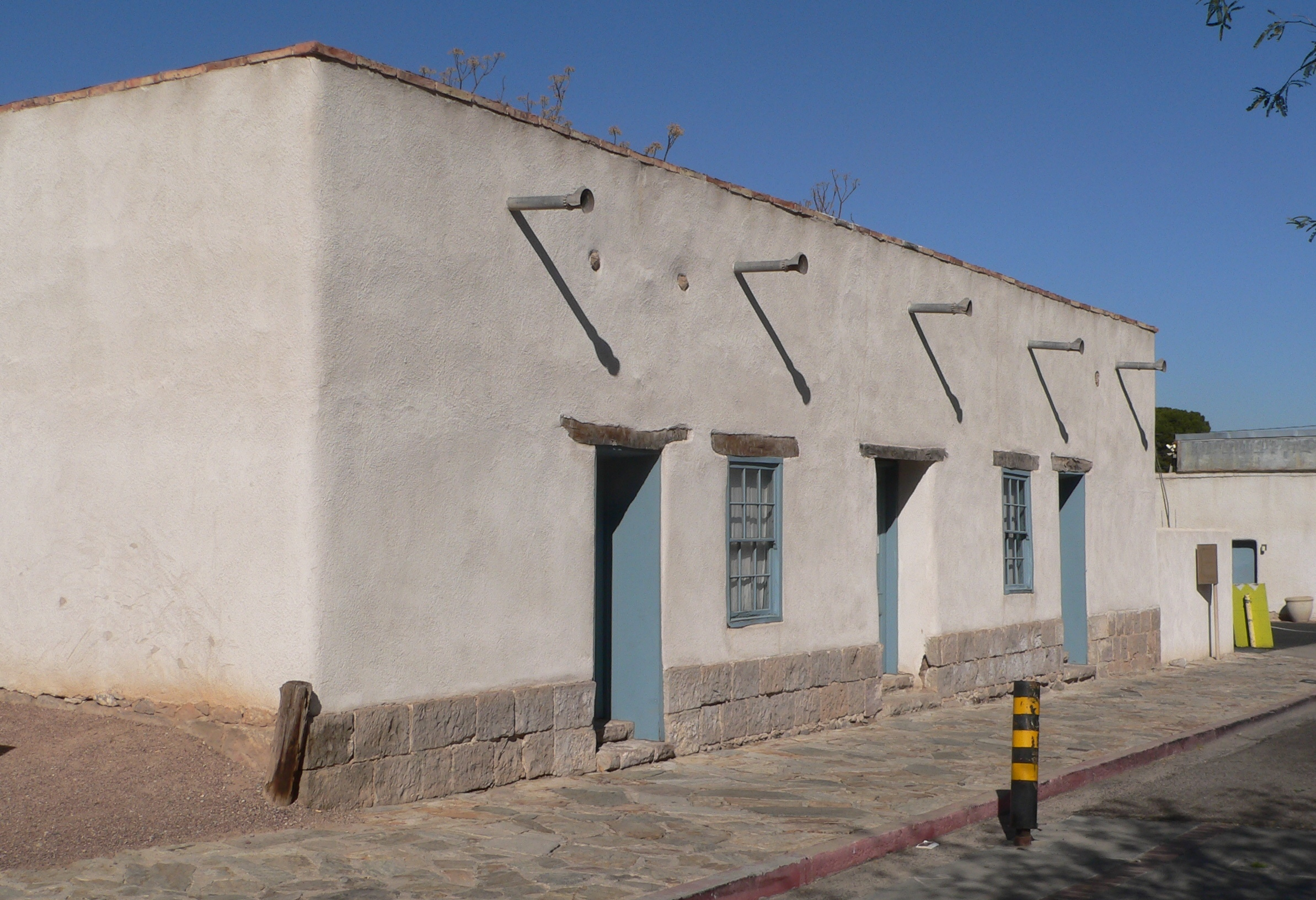
The Cordova House.

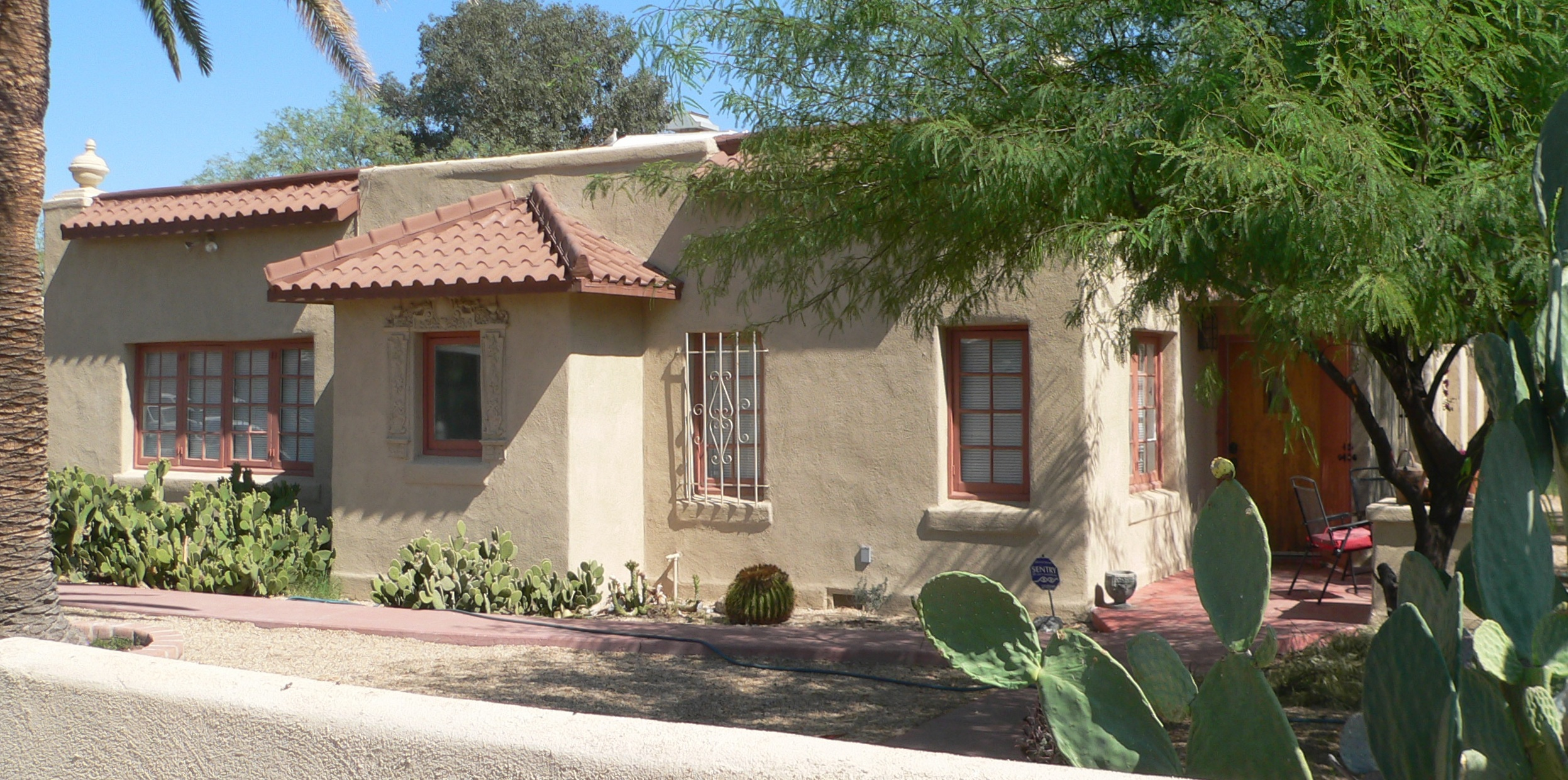
The Dodson-Esquivel House.

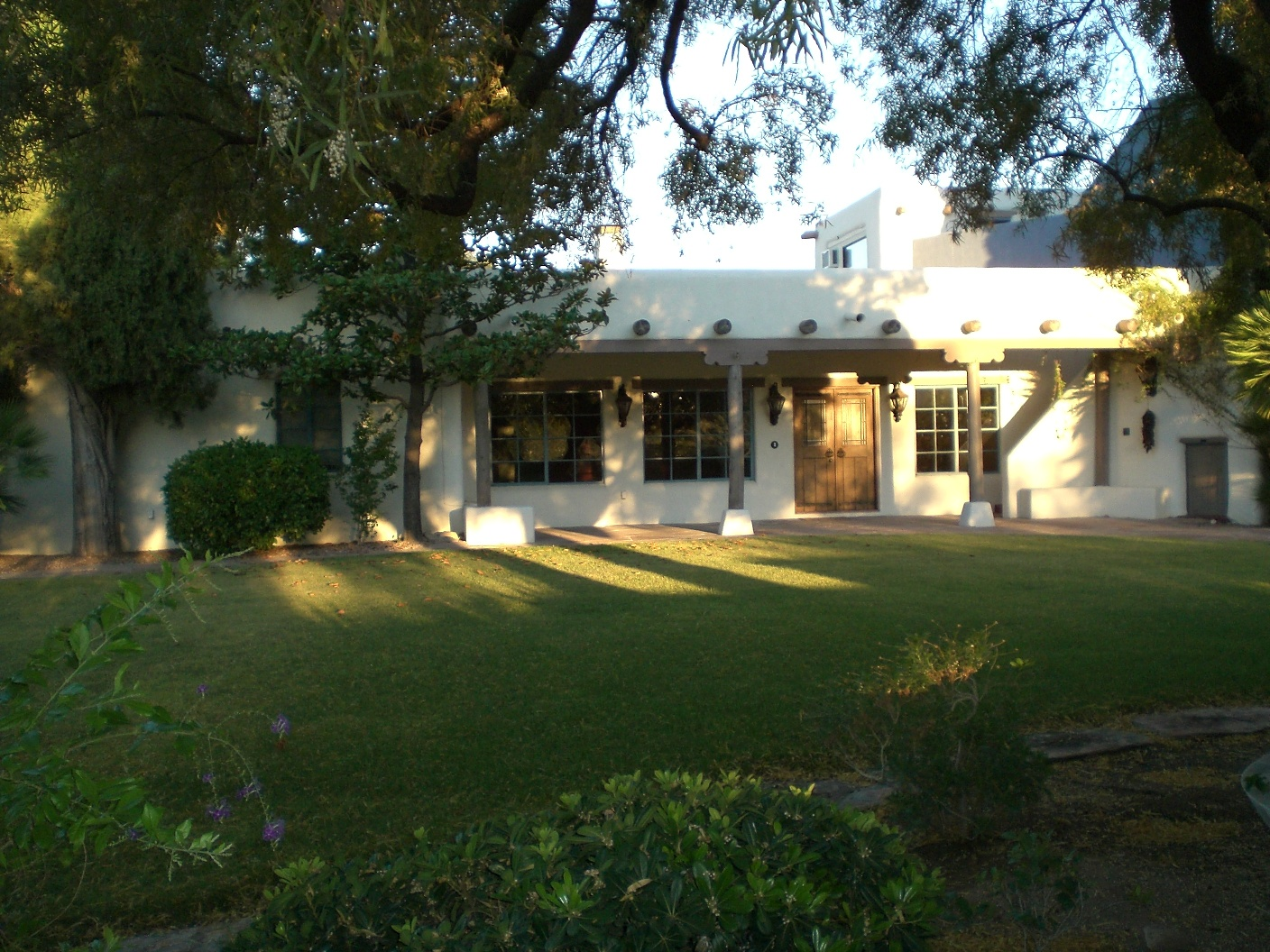
The Drexel House.

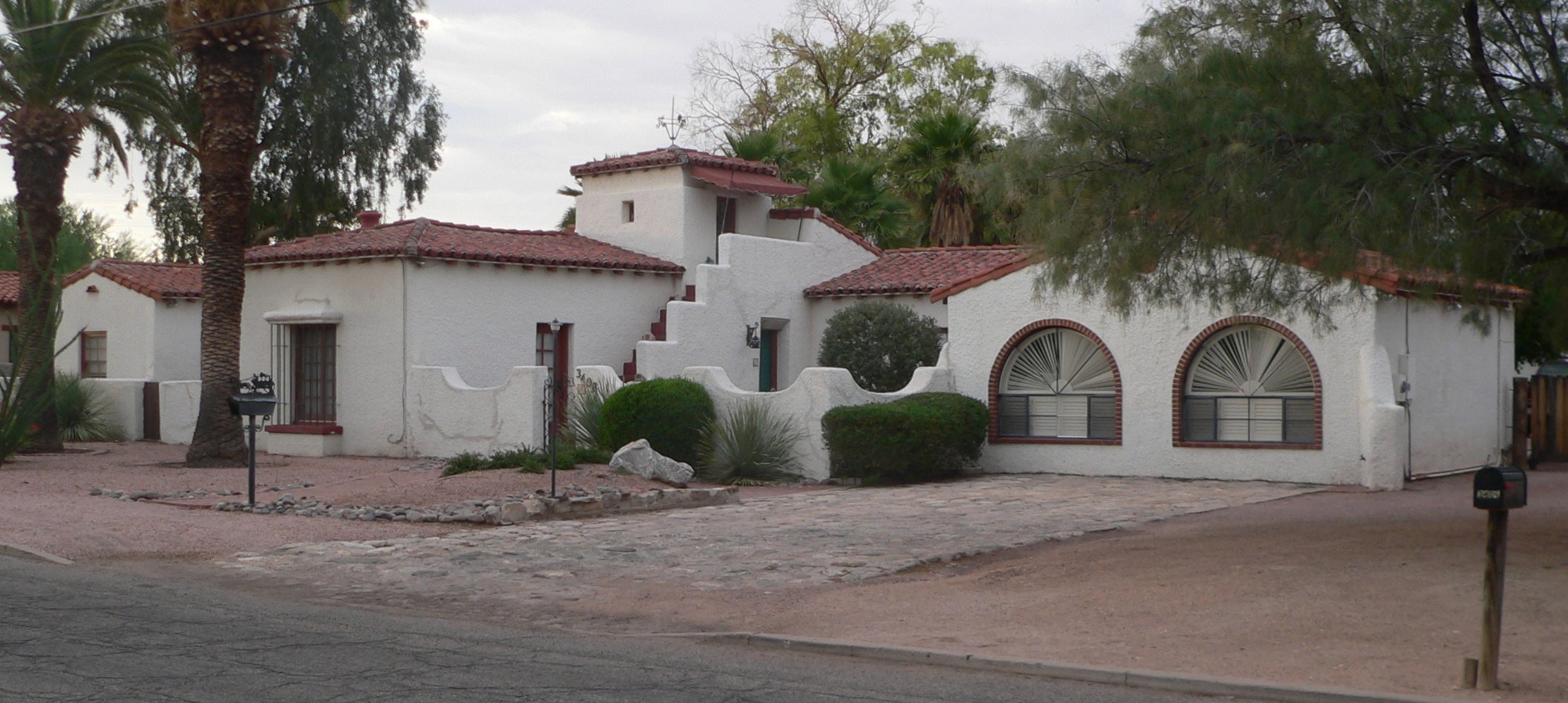
The First Joesler House.

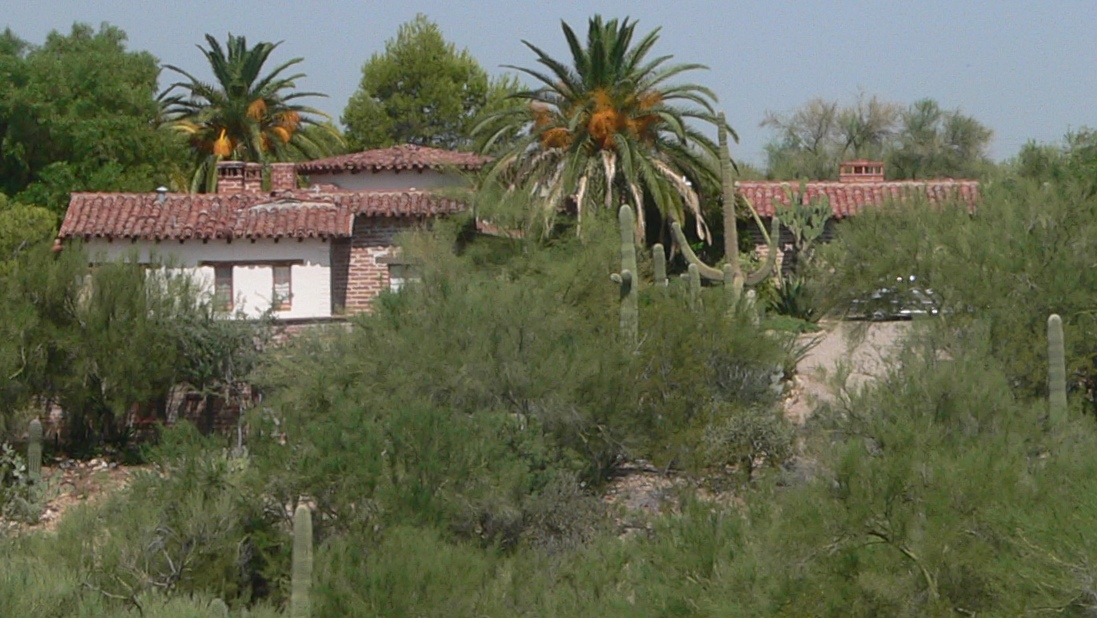
The Gabel House.

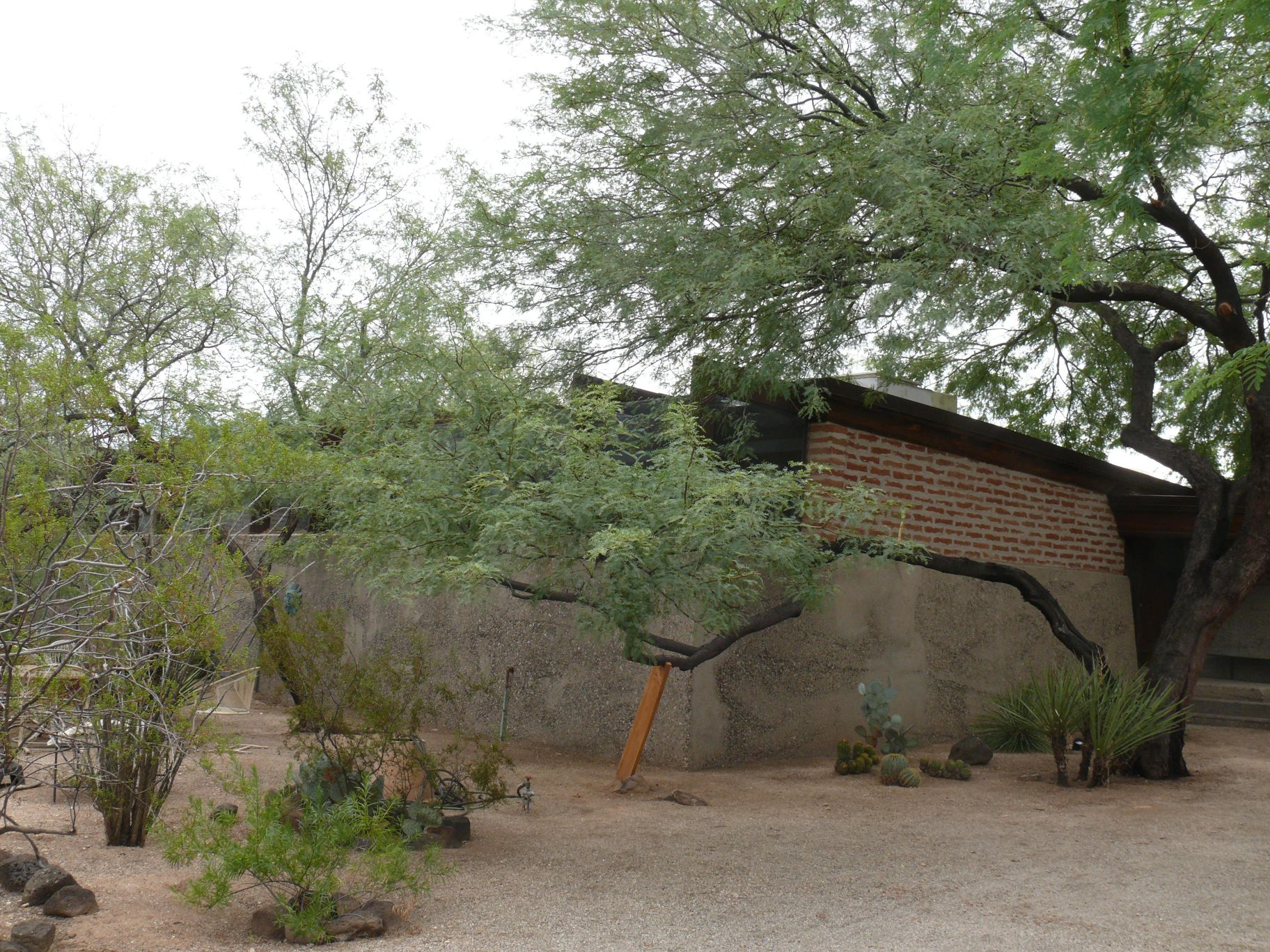
The Gist Residence.

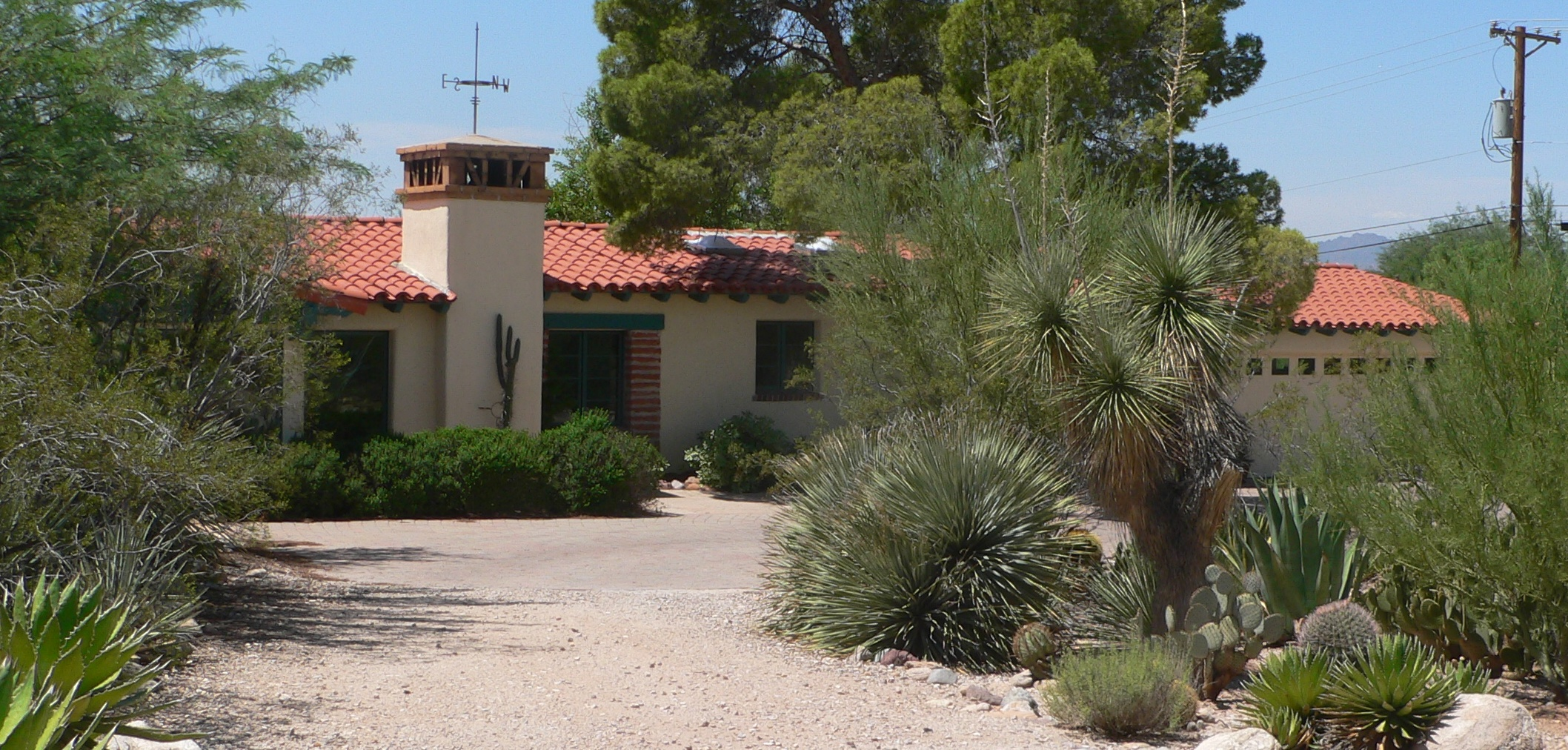
The Arthur C. and Helen Neel Hall House.

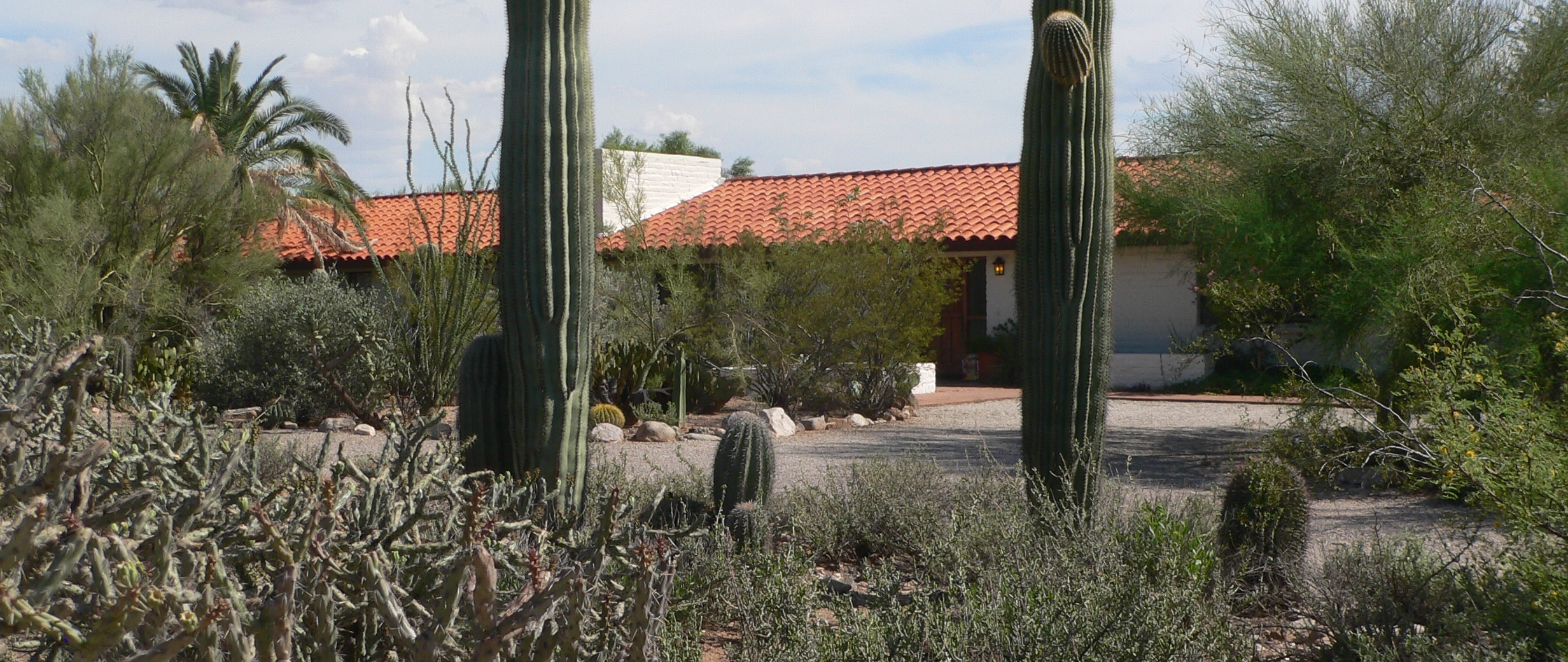
The Lewis D.W. Hall House.

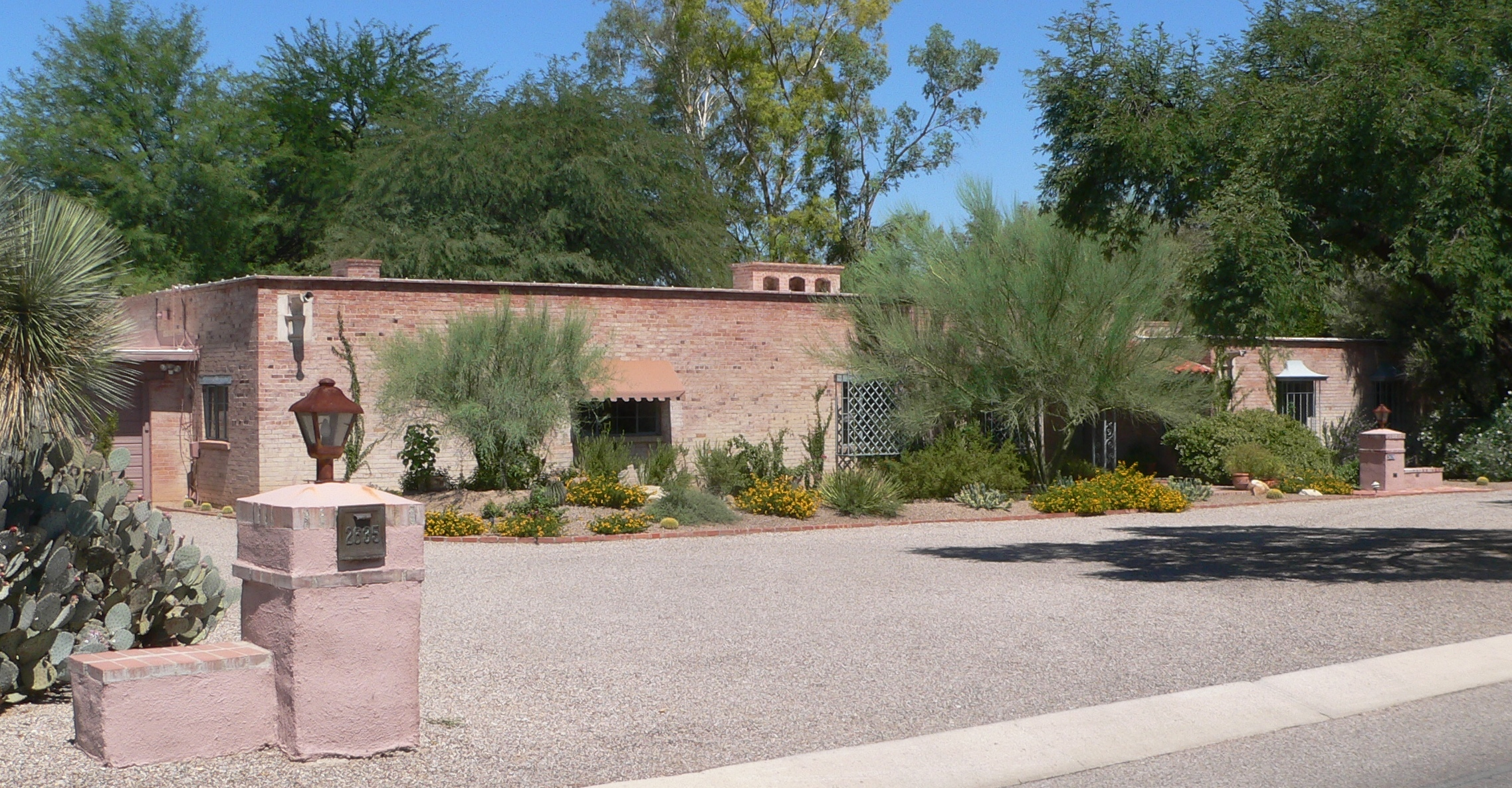
The Hecker House.

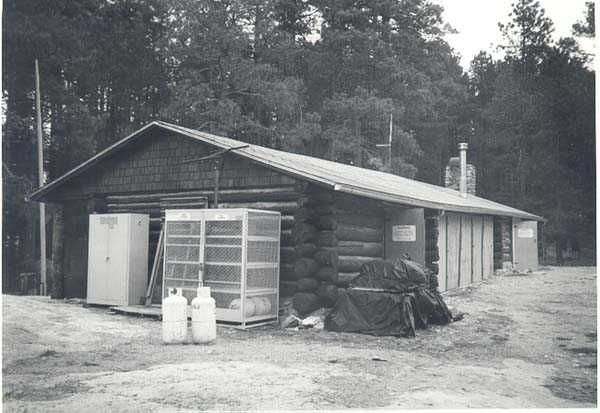
The Manning Cabin.

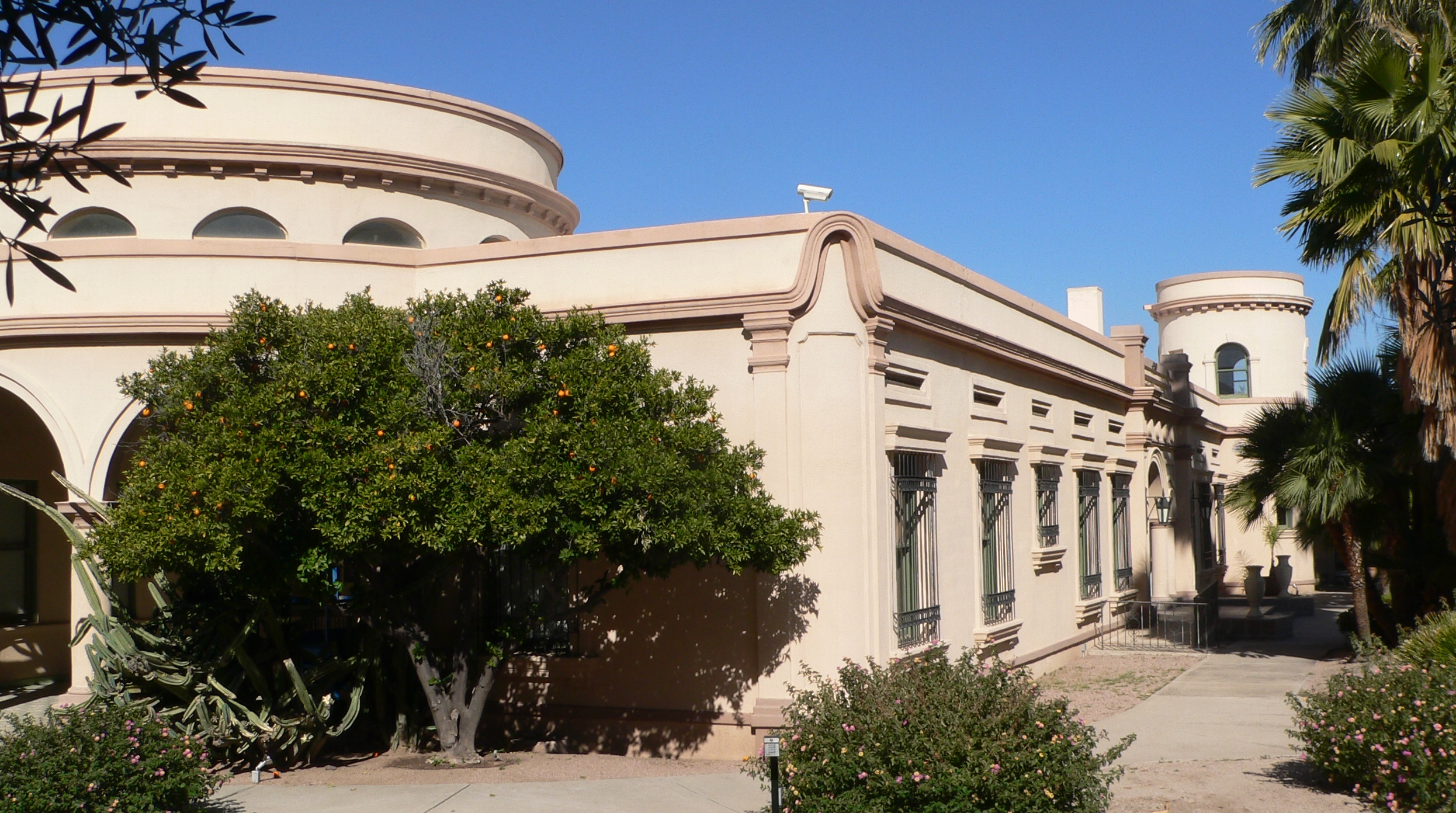
The Levi H. Manning House.

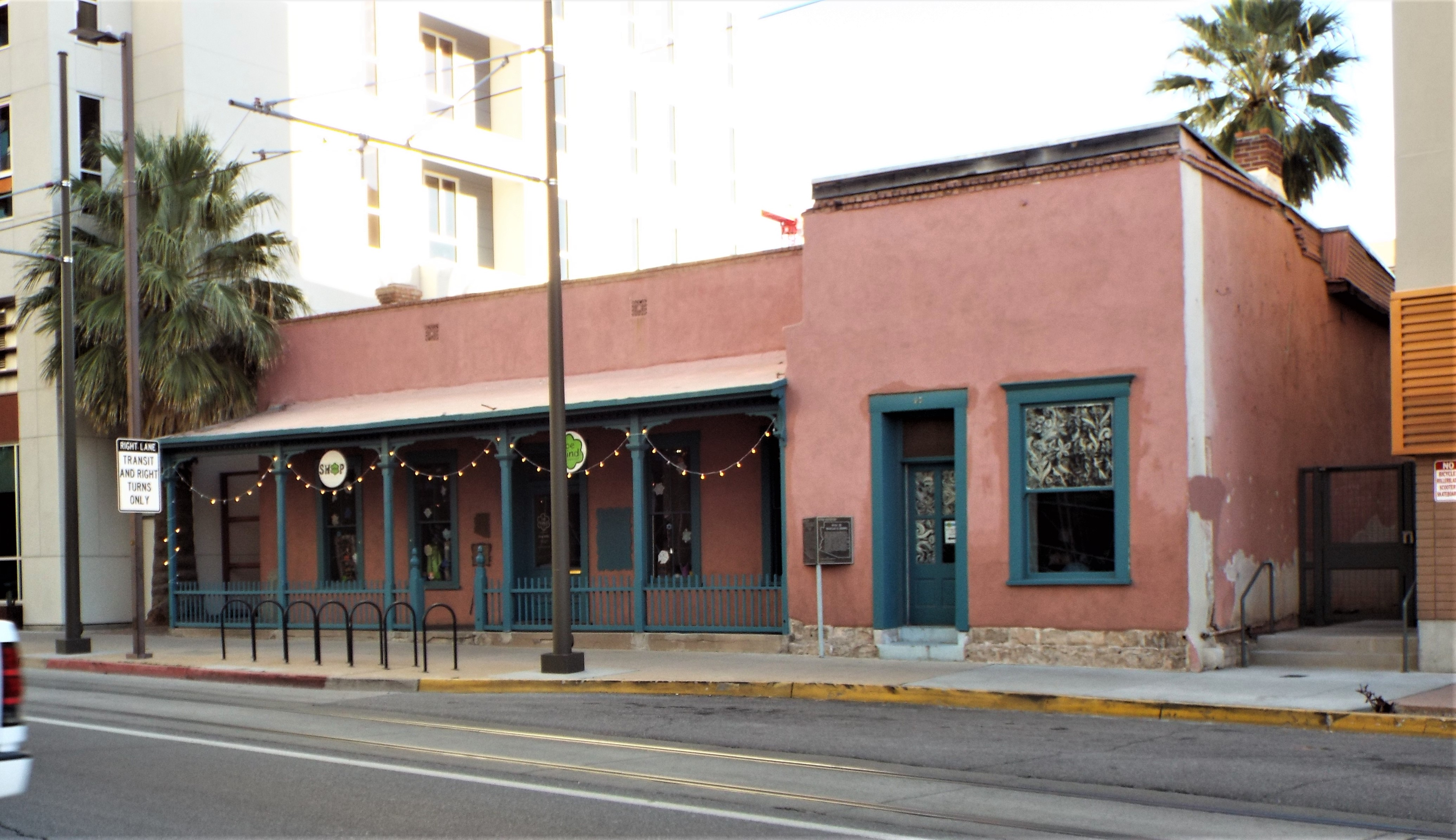
The Charles O. Brown house.

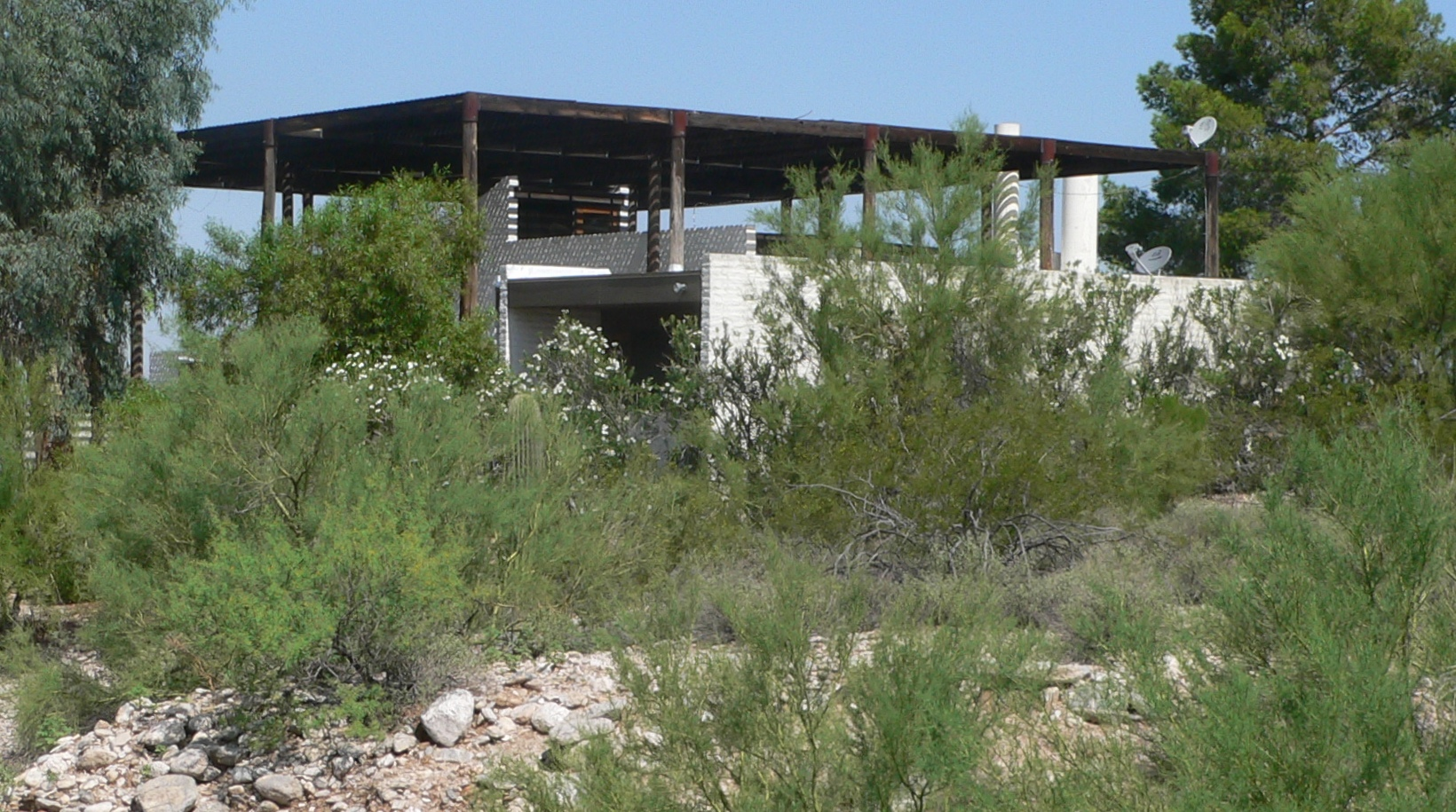
The Ramada House.

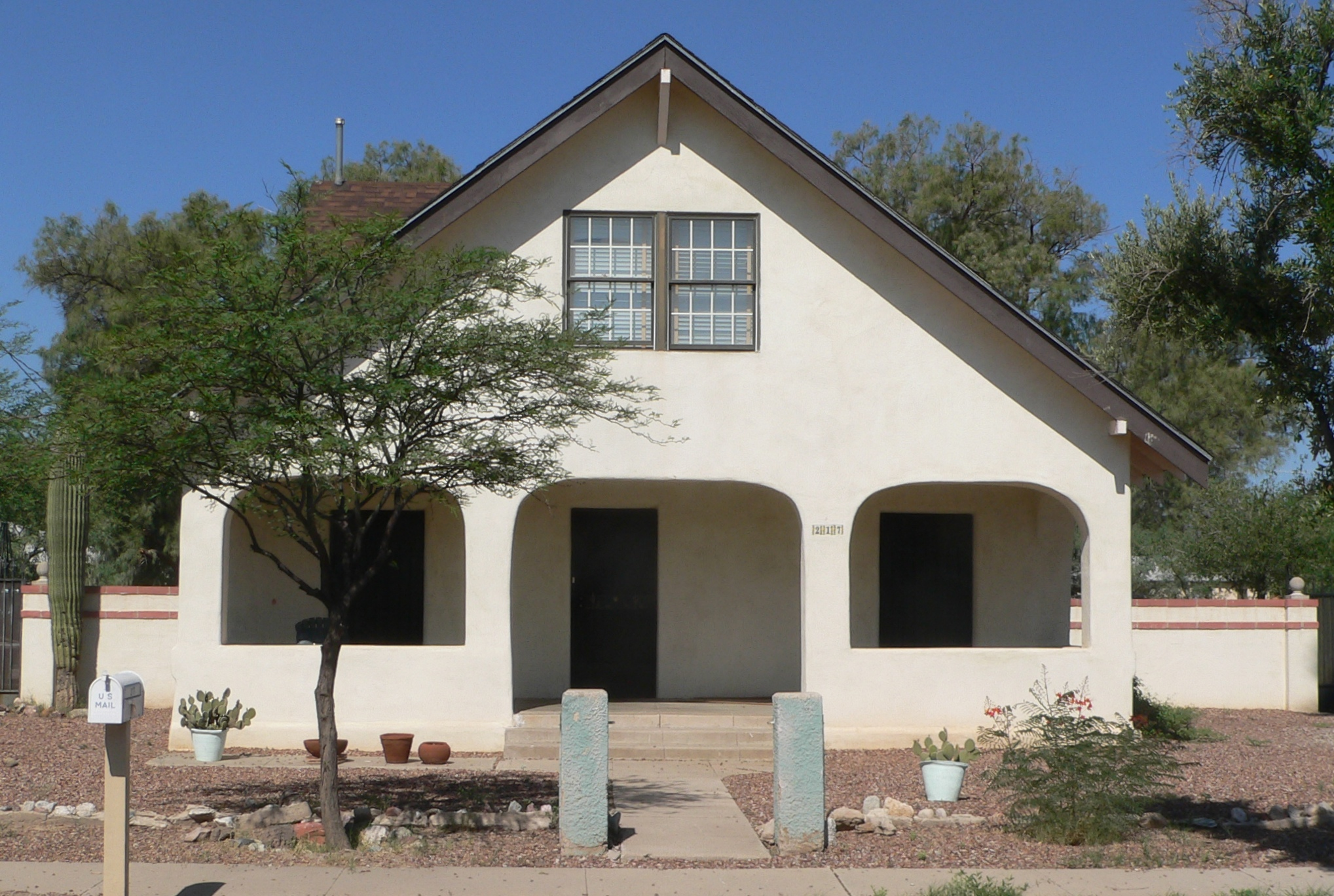
The Schwalen-Gomez House.

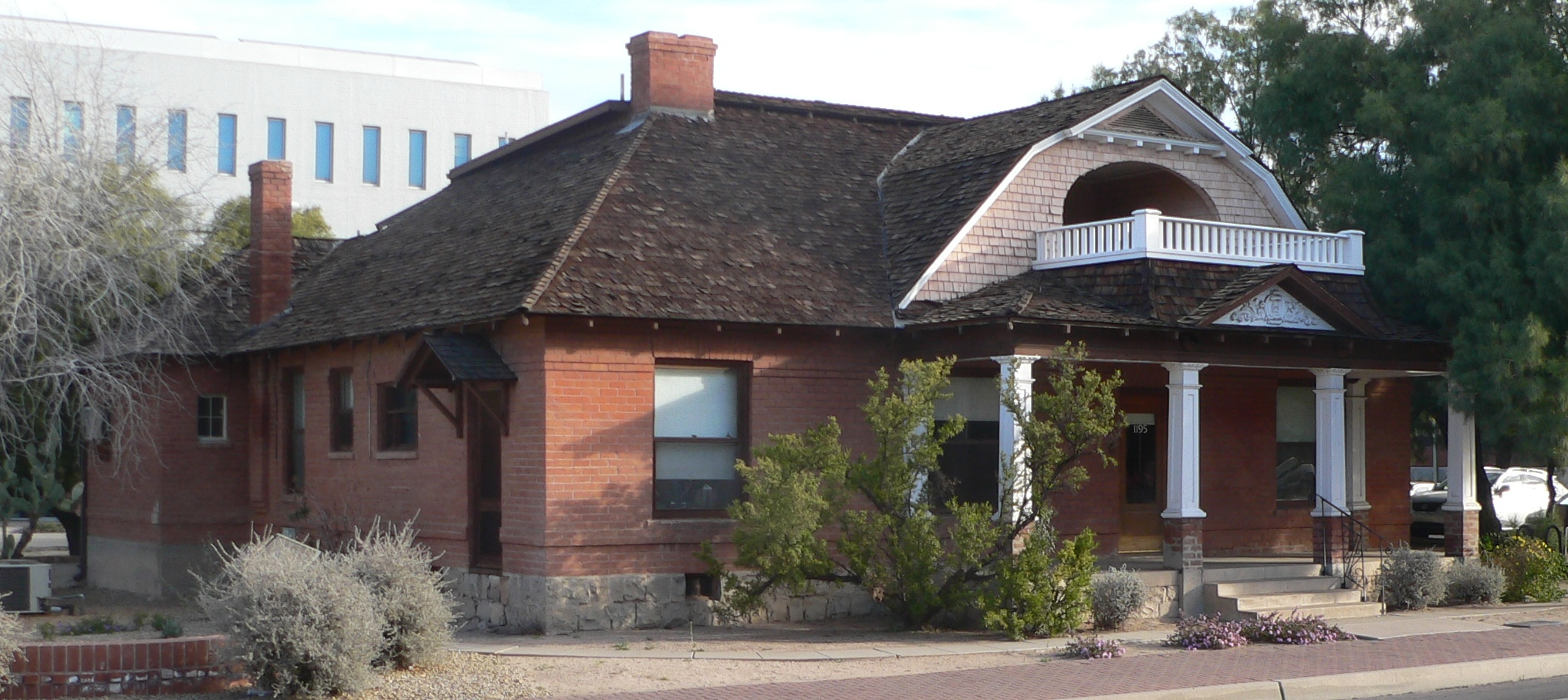
The Professor George E. P. Smith House.

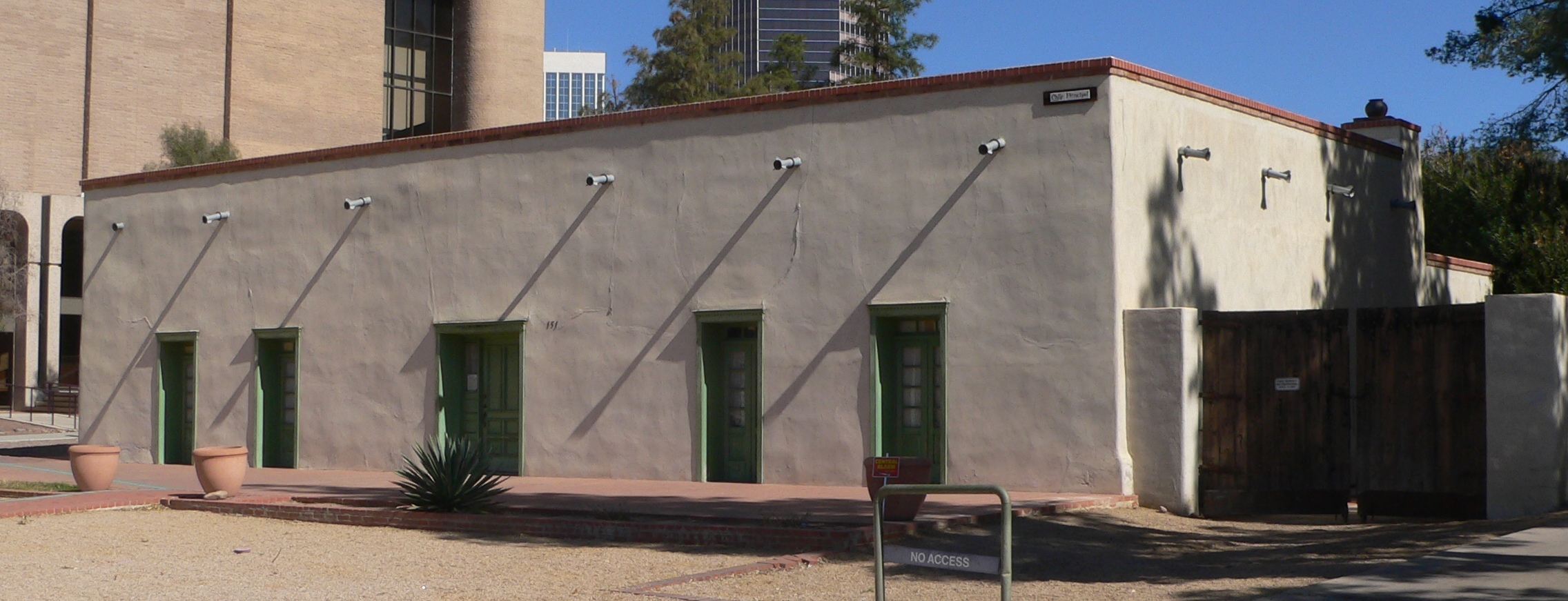
The Sosa–Carrillo–Fremont House.

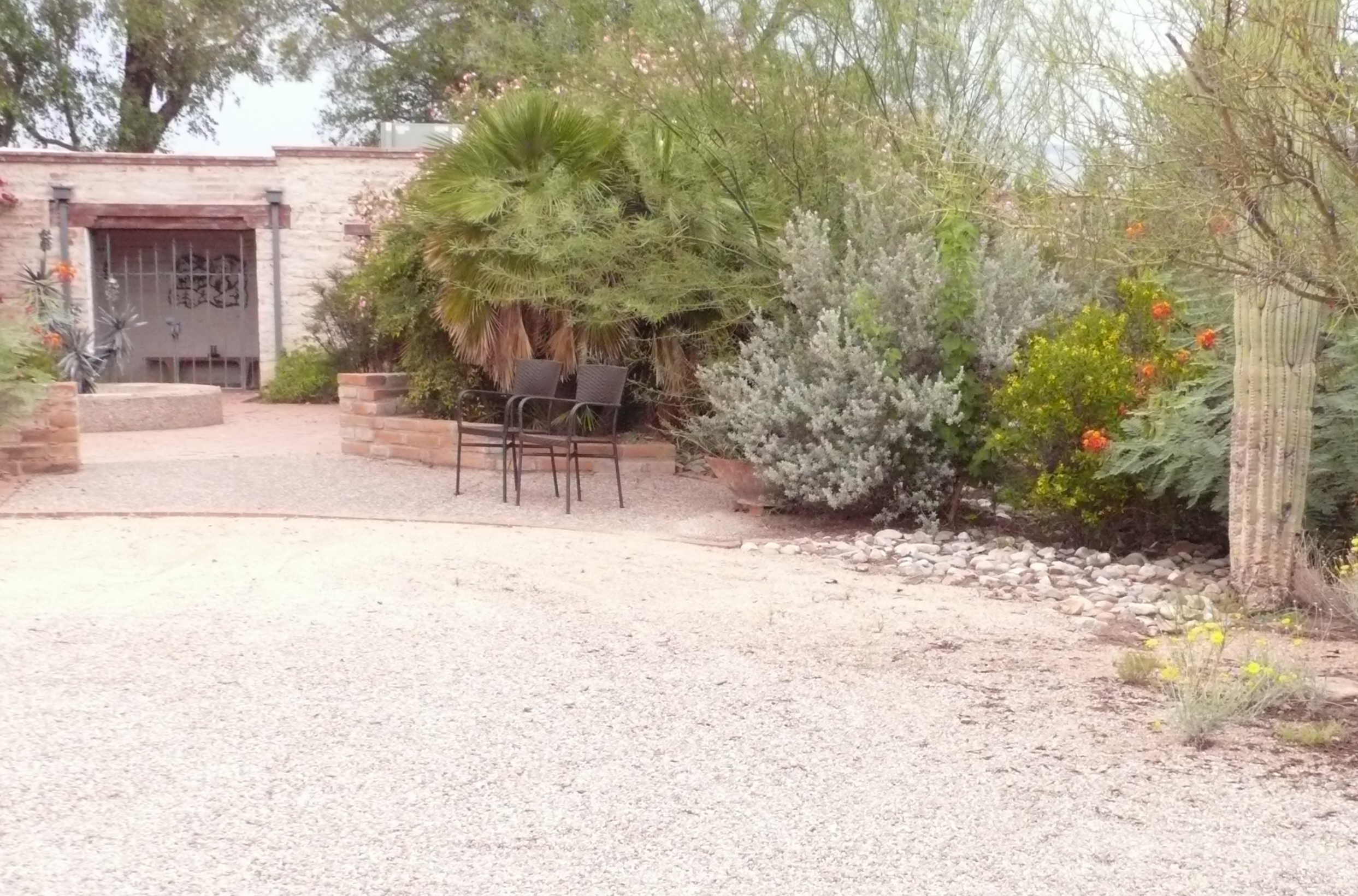
The Charles S. Todd House.

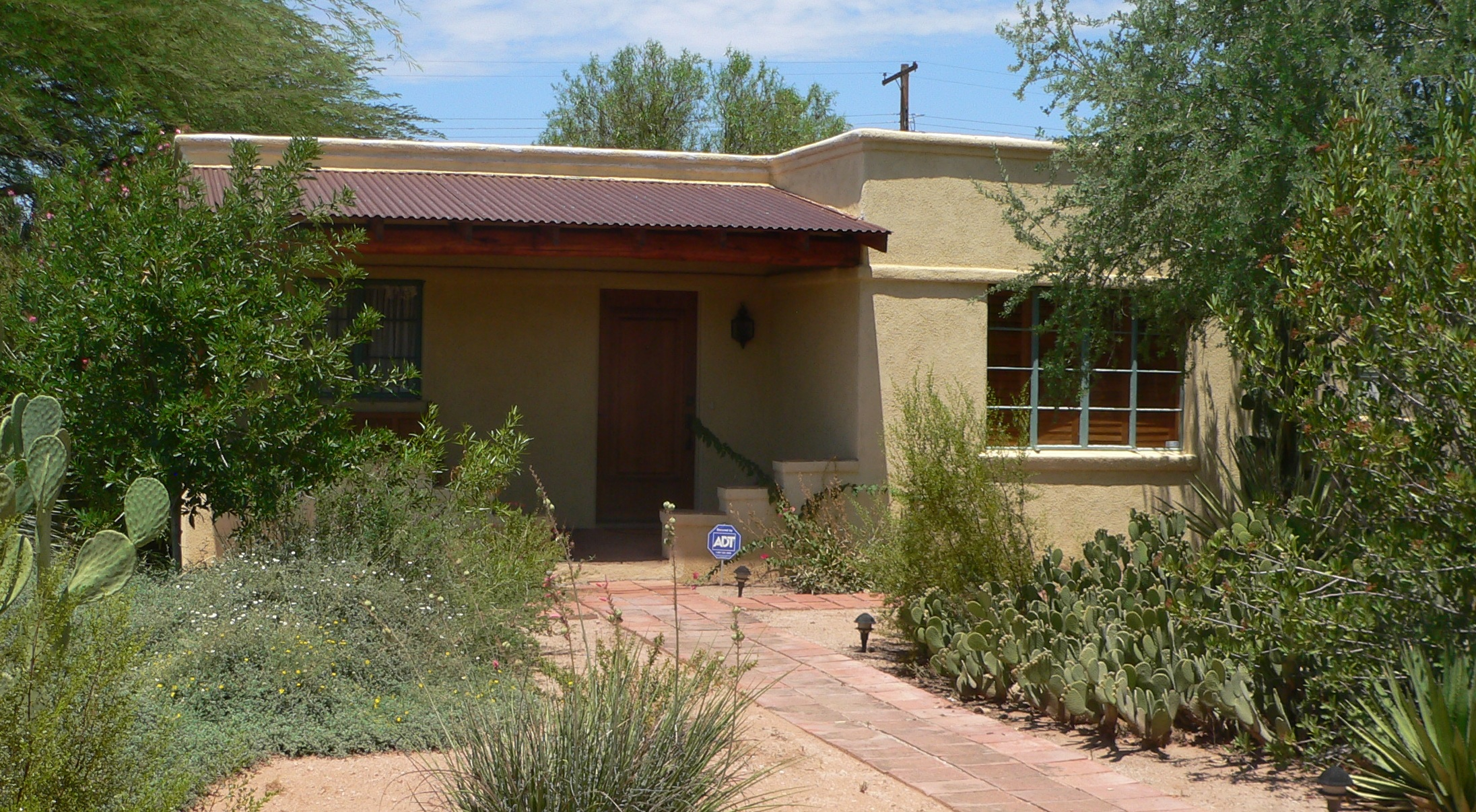
The Type A at 2101 E. Water St..

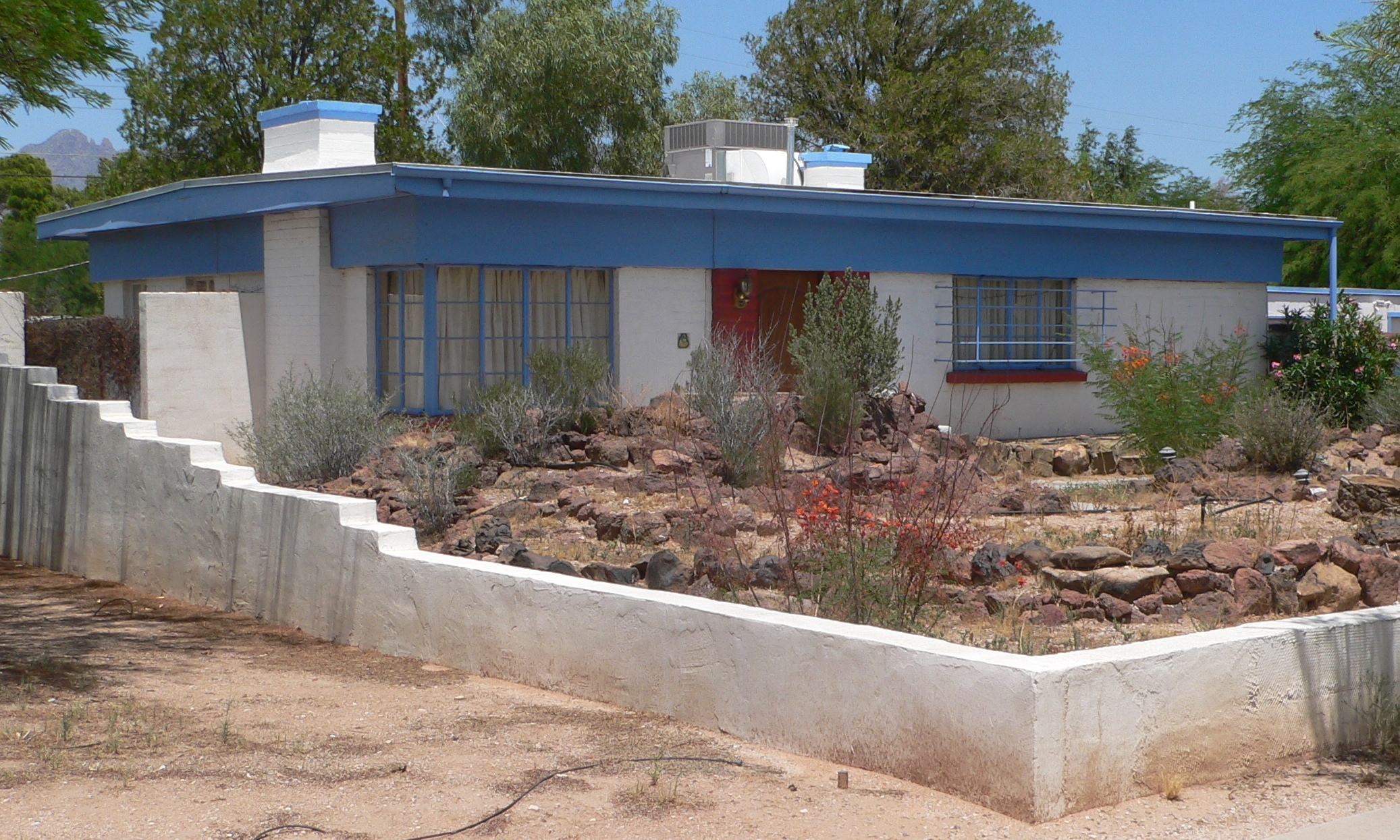
The Type B at 2019 E. Water St..

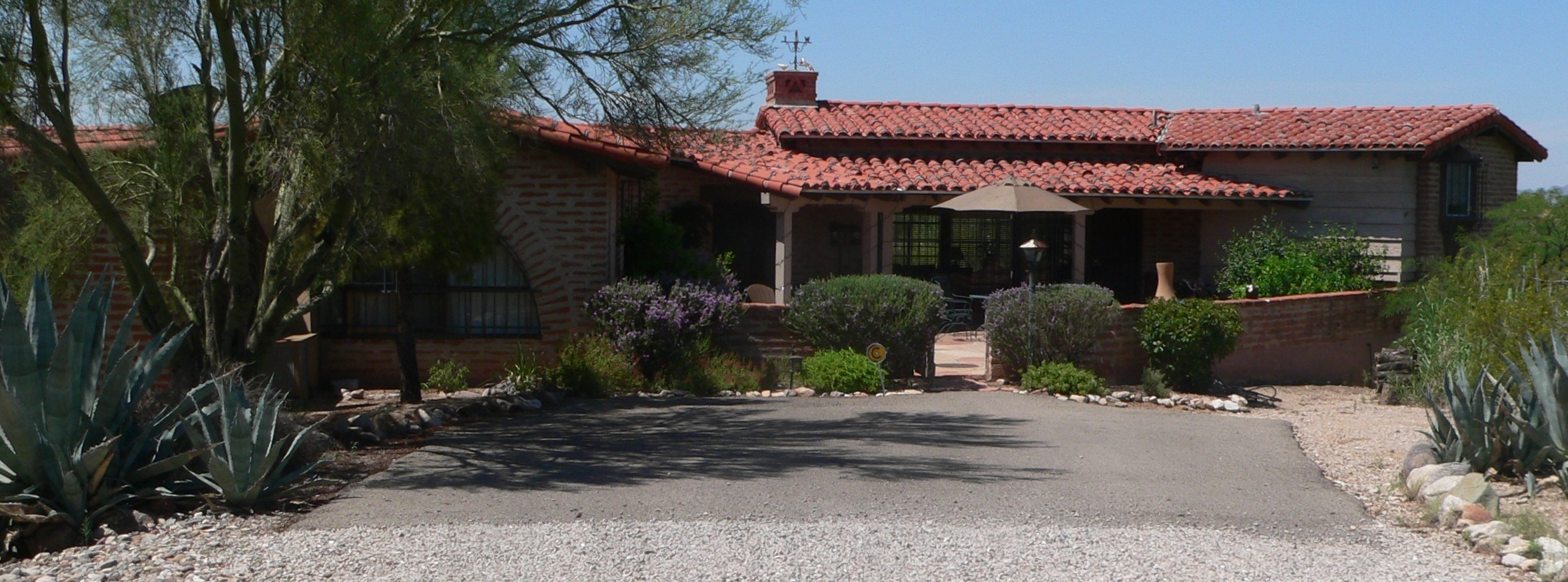
The Nellie Mae Kellogg Van Schaick House.

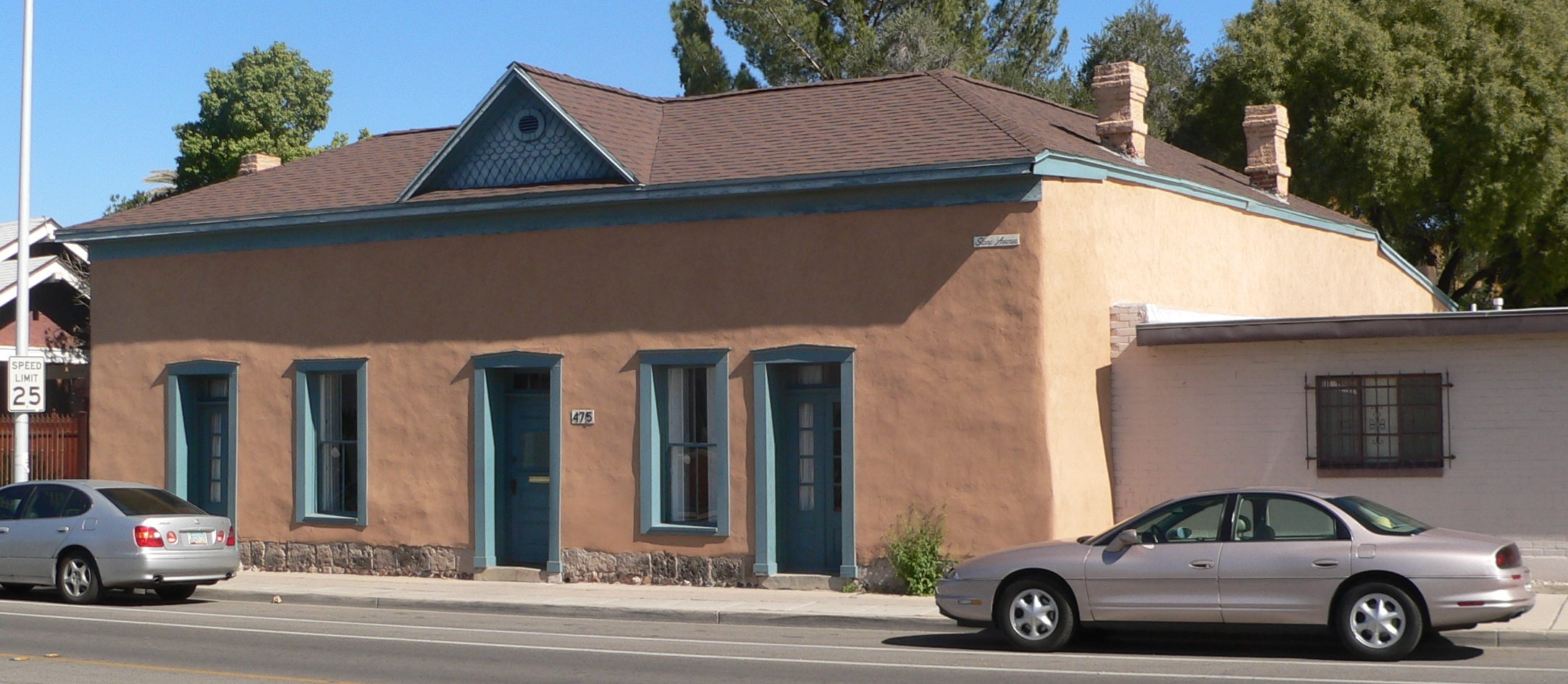
The Carlos Ygnacio Velasco House.

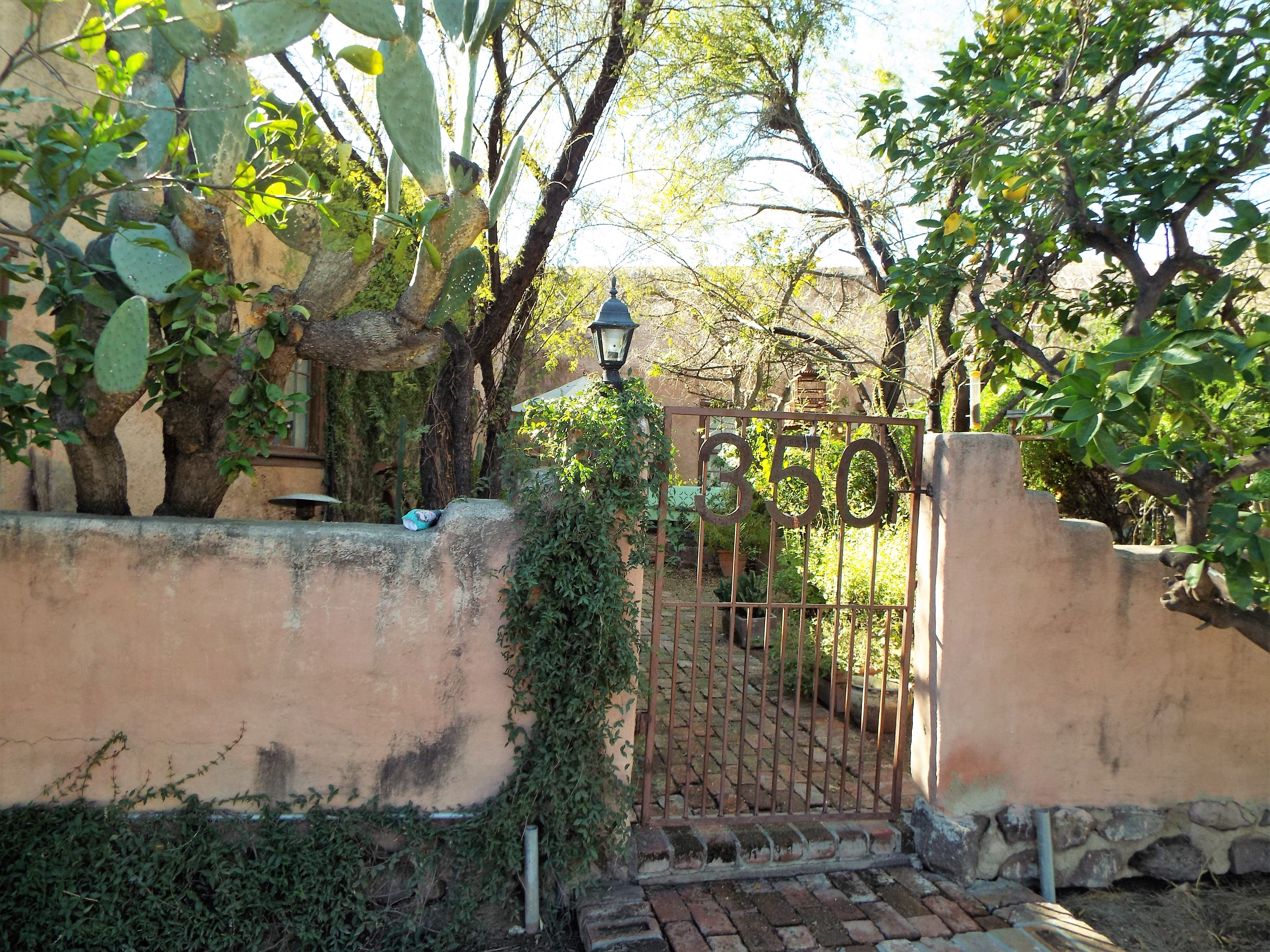
The Solomon Warner House.

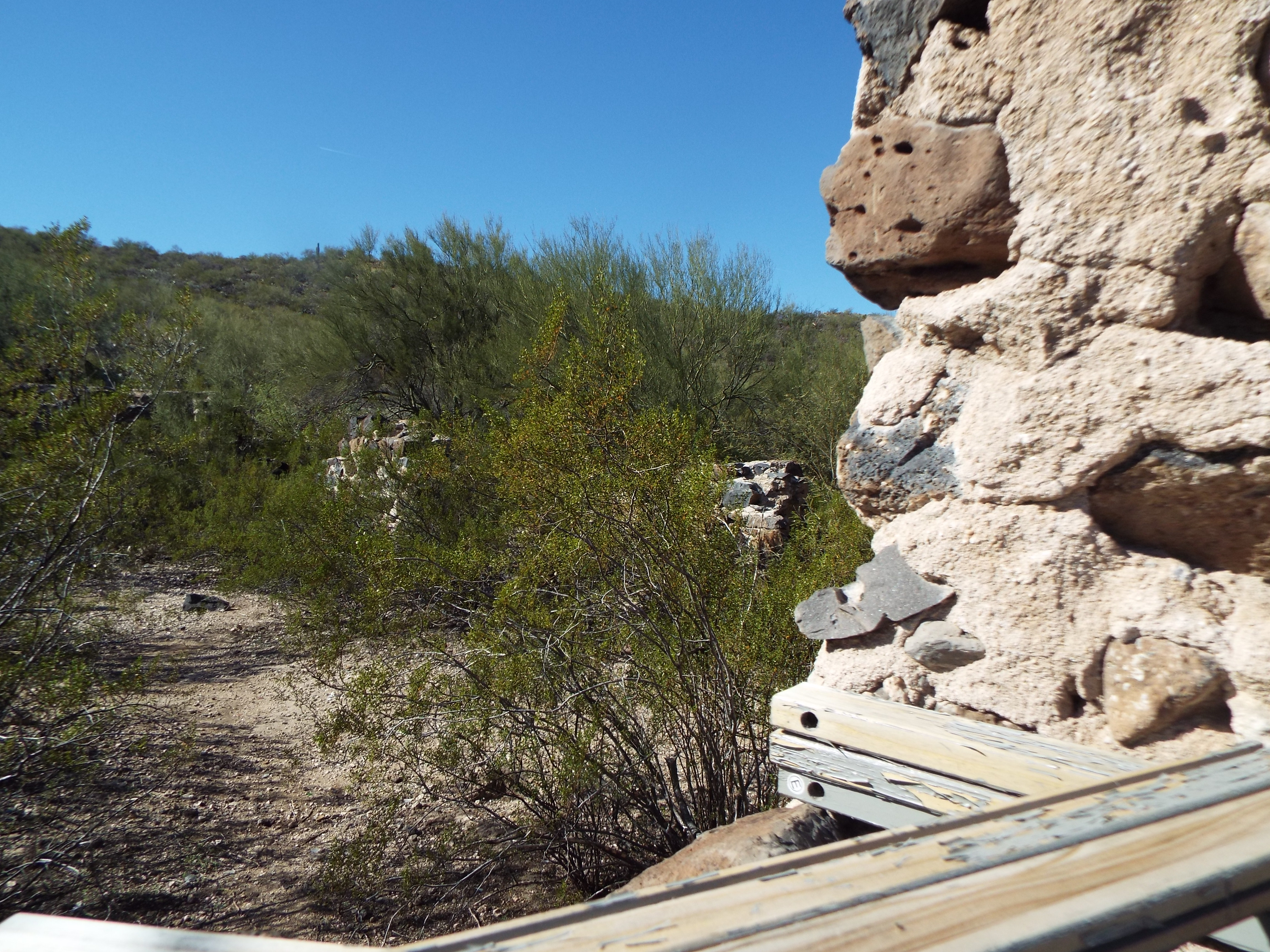
Ruins of the Solomon Warner Mill.

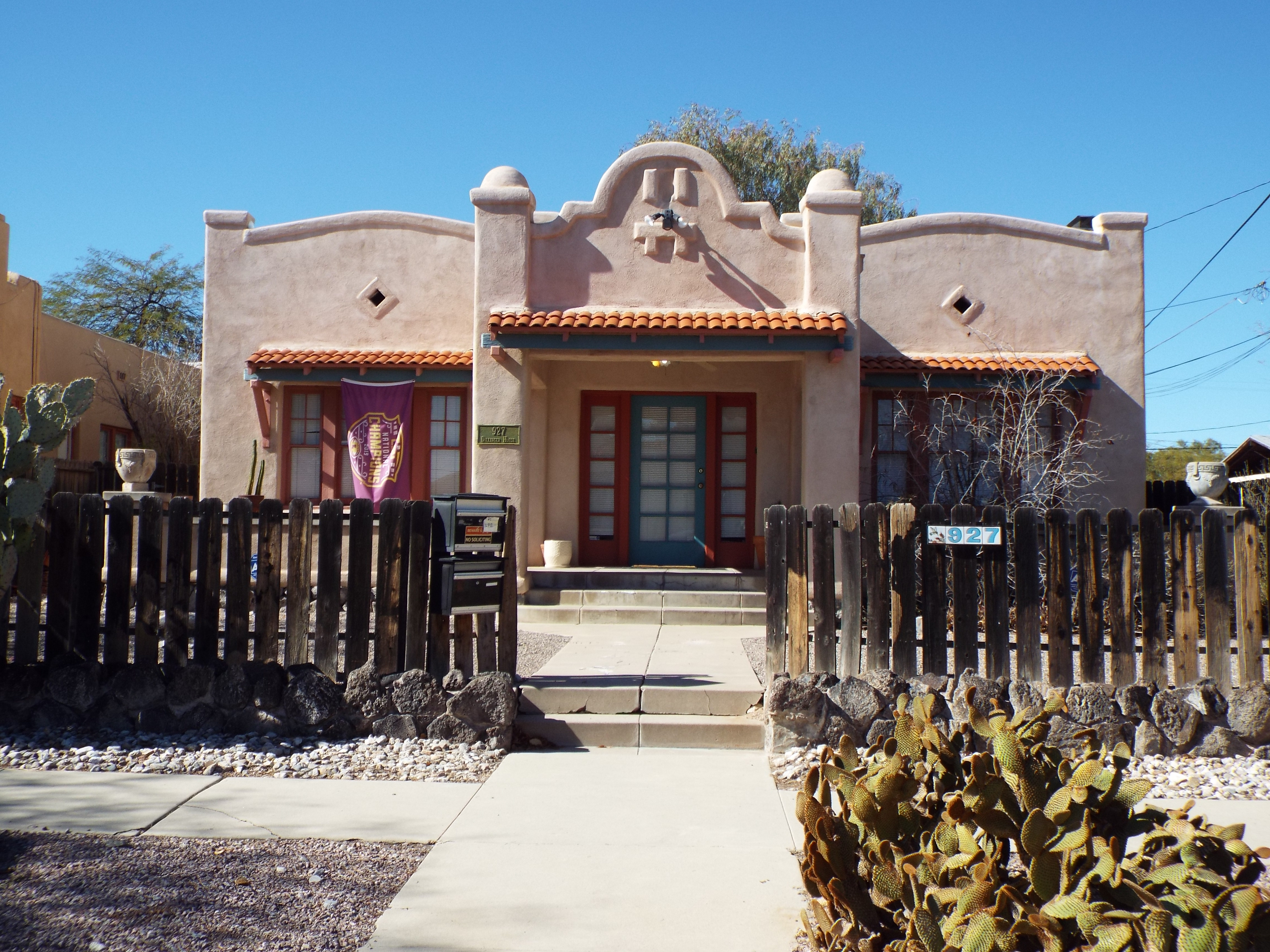
The John Dillinger House

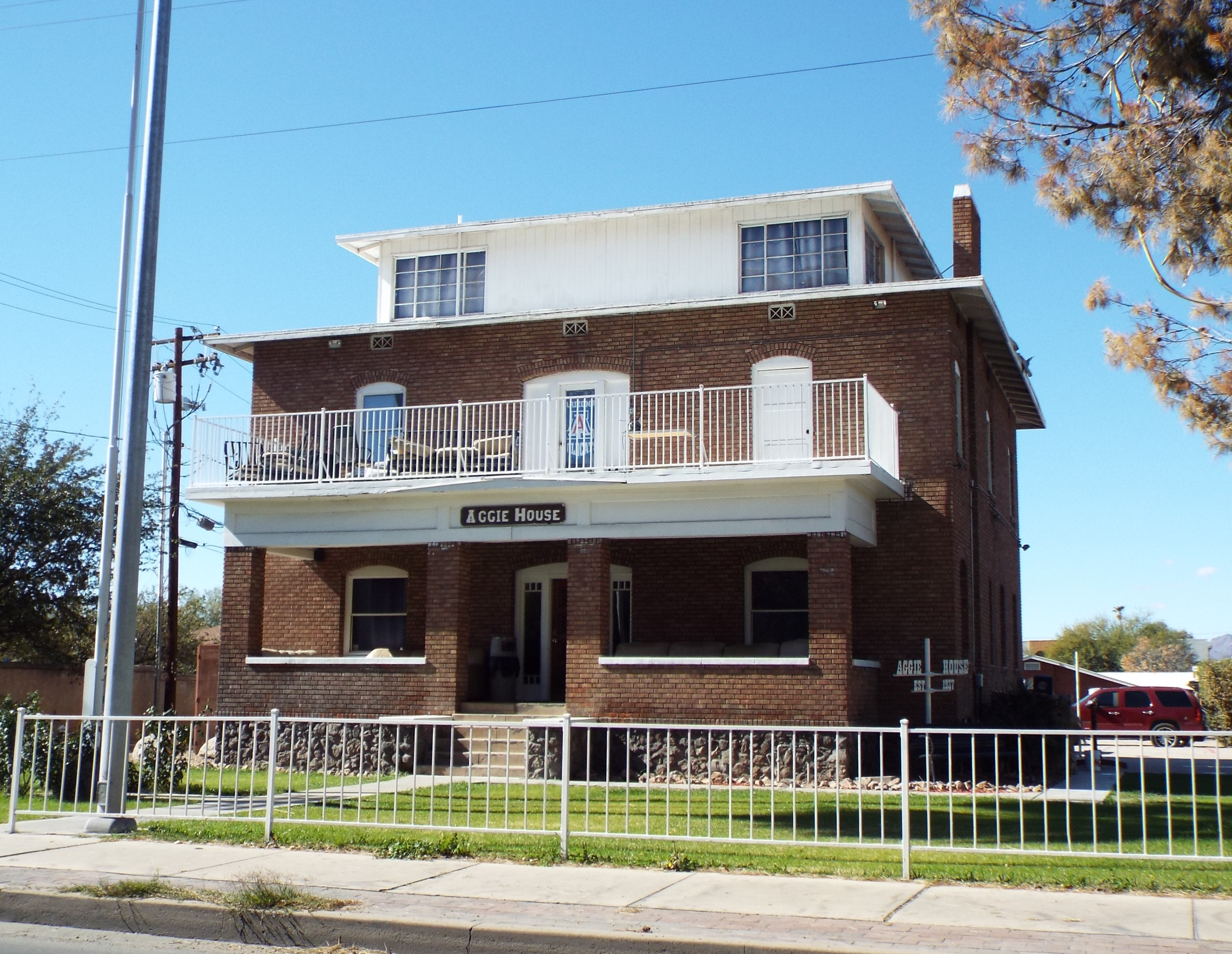
The Aggie House

The houses which are listed in the National Register of Historic Places which are not pictured are the following:

- James P. and Sarah Adams House – located at 5201 N. Camino Escuela. Listed in the National Register of Historic Places on August 30, 2011, reference: #11000568.
- Arthur Olaf and Helen S. Anderson House – located at 5505 N. Camino Escuela. Listed in the National Register of Historic Places on March 13, 2017, reference: #12001101.
- Jean and Paul Bauder House – located at 4775 N. Camino Antonio. Listed in the National Register of Historic Places on October 2, 2017, reference #100001661.
- Grace and Elliot Brown House – located at 5025 N. Camino Escuela. Listed in the National Register of Historic Places on January 24, 2017, reference: #100000550.
- Erskine P. Caldwell House – built in 1942 and located at 1915 E. Camino Miraval. Erskine Preston Caldwell was an American novelist and short story writer. The house was listed in the National Register of Historic Places on September 9, 2010, reference #10000747.
- Casa Juan Paisano – built in 1961 and located at 3300 E. Camino Juan Paisano. It was the home of developer John W. Murphey; designed by Mexican architect Juan Raymundo Wörner y Baz. Listed in the National Register of Historic Places on July 31, 2013, reference: #13000545.
- Catalina Foothills Estates Job 265 House – located at 5276 N. Camino Real. Listed in the National Register of Historic Places on March 7, 2017, reference: #100000705.
- 'Stephen and Persis Hart Browne Congdon House" – located at 2928 N. Orlando Street. Listed in the National Register of Historic Places on January 16, 2018, reference: #100001956.
- John P. and Helena S. Corcoran House – located at 2200 E. Calle Lustre. Listed in the National Register of Historic Places on August 30, 2011, reference: #11000569.
- George C. Craig House – located at 5005 N. Calle La Vela. Listed in the National Register of Historic Places on June 26, 2017, reference: #100001230.
- P.W. Fletcher House – located at 4850 N. Campbell Ave. Listed in the National Register of Historic Places on August 30, 2011, reference: #11000570.
- Antonio Matus House and Property – built in 1926 and located at 856 W. Calle Santa Ana. Listed in the National Register of Historic Places on July 22, 1991, reference: #91000900.
- Phillip G. McFadden House – located at 5130 Camino Real. List in the National Register of Historic Places on March 30, 2011, reference: #11000573.
- Sabedra-Huerta House – built in 1915 and located at 1036–1038 N. 13th Ave. Listed in the National Register of Historic Places on November 10, 1988, reference: #88002132.
- Betty-Jean Wilson House – built in 1935 and located at 2322 E. Calle Lustre. Listed in the National Register of Historic Places on February 23, 2016, reference: #16000024.
- Herbert and Irma Woollen House – located at 4925 N. Camino Antonio. Listed in the National Register of Historic Places on March 13, 2017, reference: #12001108.

=== Houses of religious worship ===
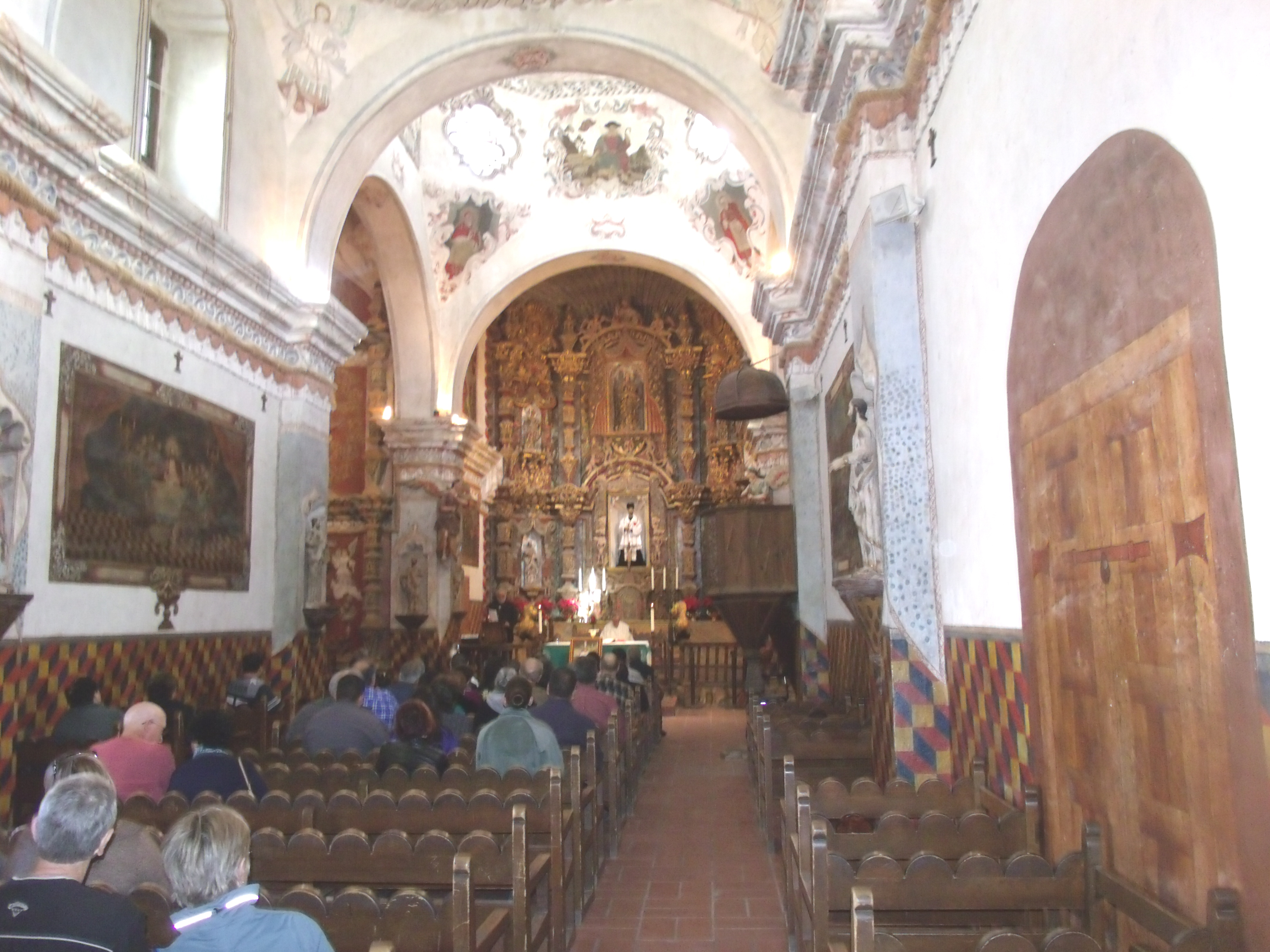
Inside the Mission San Xavier del Bac.

- The Mission San Xavier del Bac standing today was rebuilt 1783–1797 and is located at 1950 West San Xavier Rd.. Inside every wall is covered with paintings. This structure passed through various historic periods of Arizona. It was first built when Arizona belonged to Spain. Later Arizona became part of Mexico and finally a state of the United States of America. It is the oldest European structure in Arizona. It was listed in the National Register of Historic Places in 1966, ref.: #66000191.
- Mortuary Chapel in the compounds of the Mission San Xavier del Bac which was rebuilt 1783–1797. This small chapel is just to the west of the Mission San Xavier del Bac's front entrance. It is located at 1950 West San Xavier Rd.. It houses statues of saints as well as candles used for special prayers. It was listed in the National Register of Historic Places in 1966, together with the "Mission San Xavier del Bac" ref.: #66000191.
- Catalina American Baptist Church – built in 1960 and located at 1900 N. Country Club Rd. The church building features notable Modern Movement and Sculptural Expressionism style elements in its design. Listed in the National Register of Historic Places on May 23, 2008, reference: #08000430.
- St. Philip's in the Hills Episcopal Church – built in 1936 and located at 4440 N. Campbell Ave. Listed in the National Register of Historic Places on December 17, 2004, reference: 04001347.
- Santa Cruz Catholic Church – built between 1916 and 1918 and located at 1220 S. 6th Ave. The Santa Cruz Catholic Church was built Manuel G. Flores in the Spanish Colonial Revival style with Islamic nuances, including a minaret-like bell tower. Listed in the National Register of Historic Places on October 7, 1994, reference: 94001196.
- El Tiradito – known as The Wishing Shrine is located at 221 S. Main St.. According to the Phoenix New Times publication, El Tiradito is the only Catholic shrine in the United States dedicated to a sinner buried in unconsecrated ground. It is said that the man buried there died fighting for the love of a woman. Listed in the National Register of Historic Places on November 19, 1971, reference: 71000115.
- Pascua Cultural Plaza – built in 1921, and located at 785 W. Sahuaro St.. The Pascua Cultural Plaza is a sacred ceremonial site for the Yoeme (Yaqui) people. The ceremonies are both pre-Christian and Christian in origin. Listed in the National Register of Historic Places on September 22, 2004, reference: 04001032.
- Our Lady of Guadalupe Chapel – located on the historic Tumamoc Hill which is listed in the National Register of Historic Places.
Historic Mission San Xavier del Bac

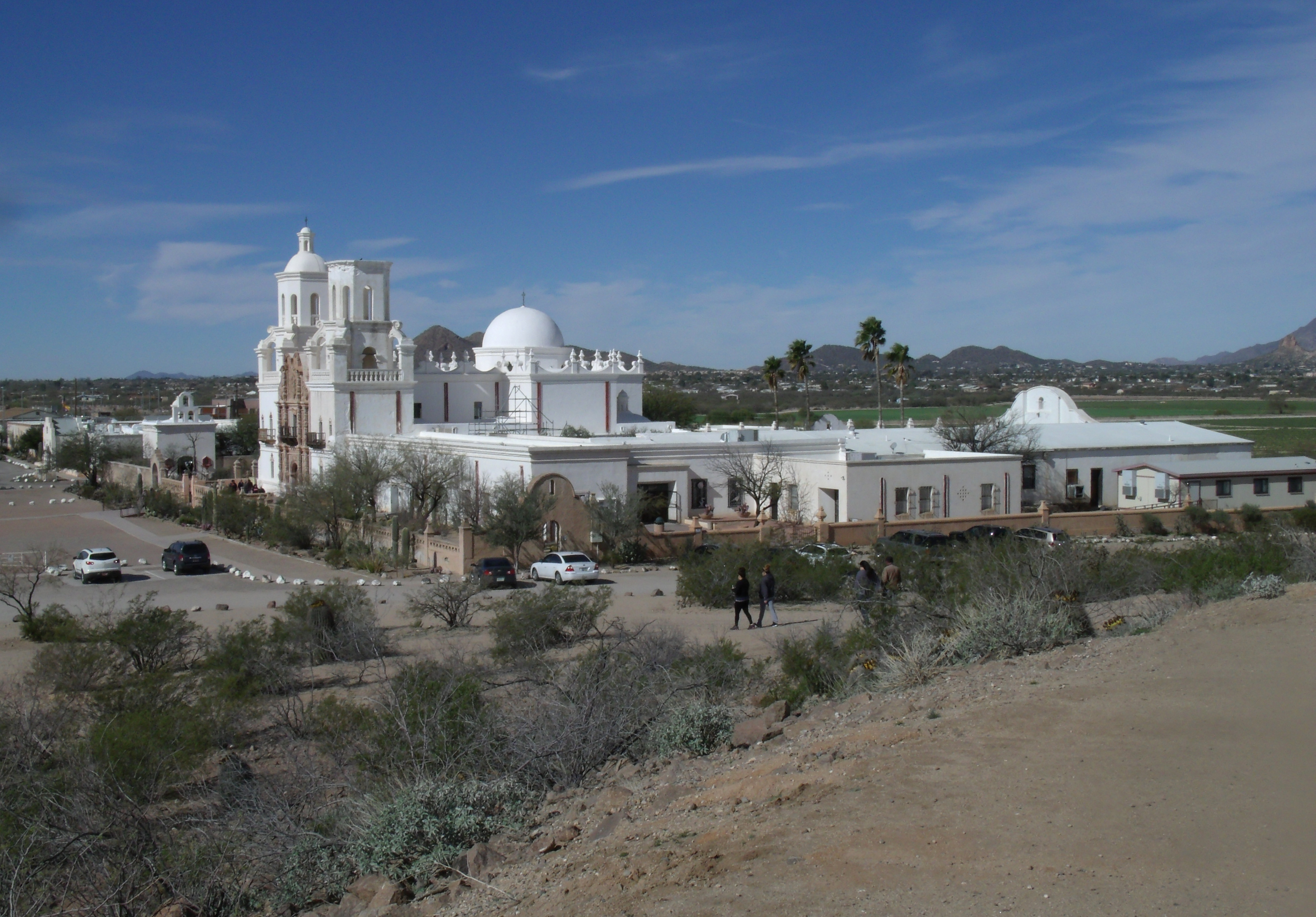
Mission San Xavier del Bac

(NRHP = National Register of Historic Places)
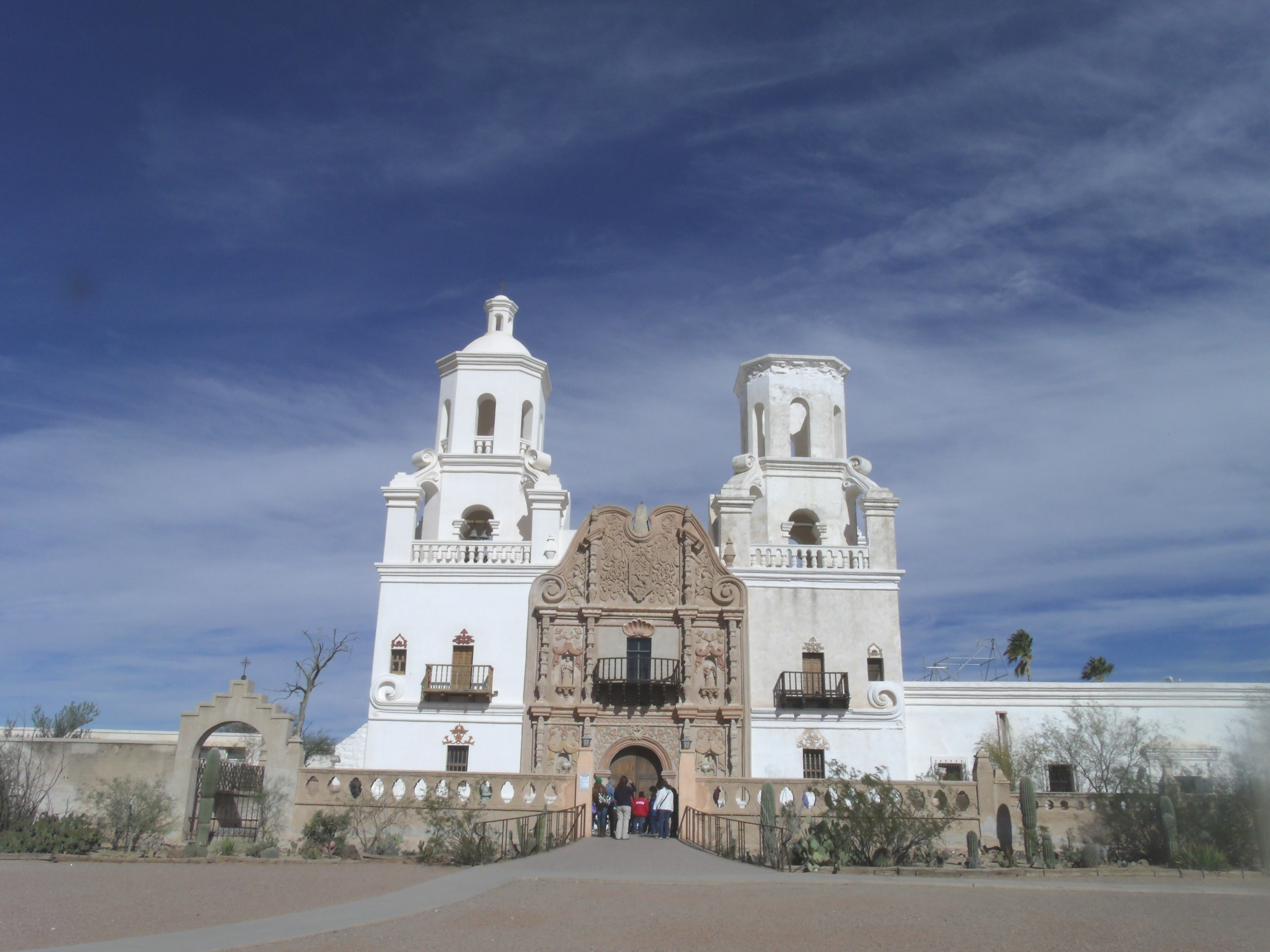
The Mission San Xavier del Bac1.

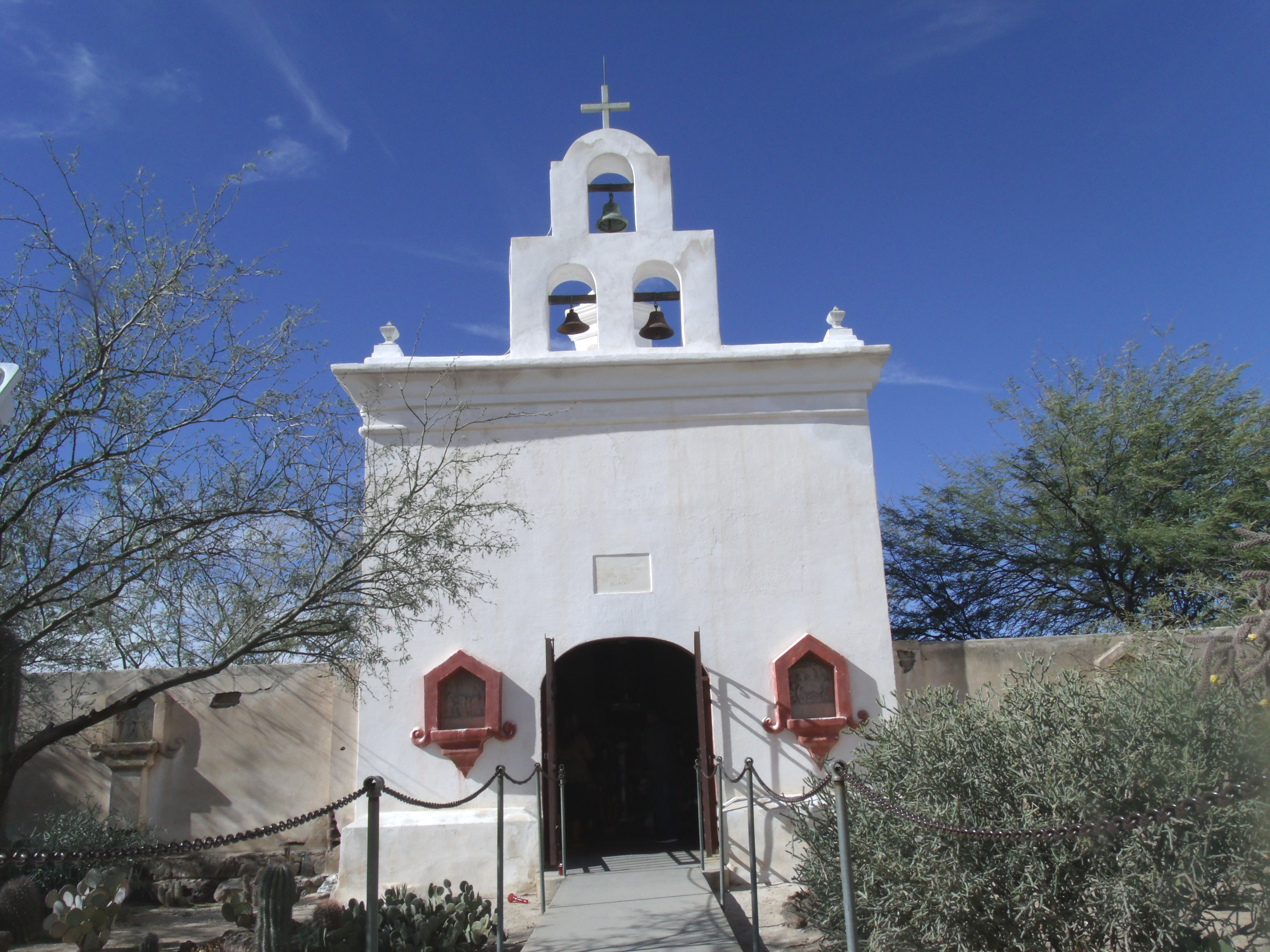
Mission San Xavier del Bac Mortuary Chapel.

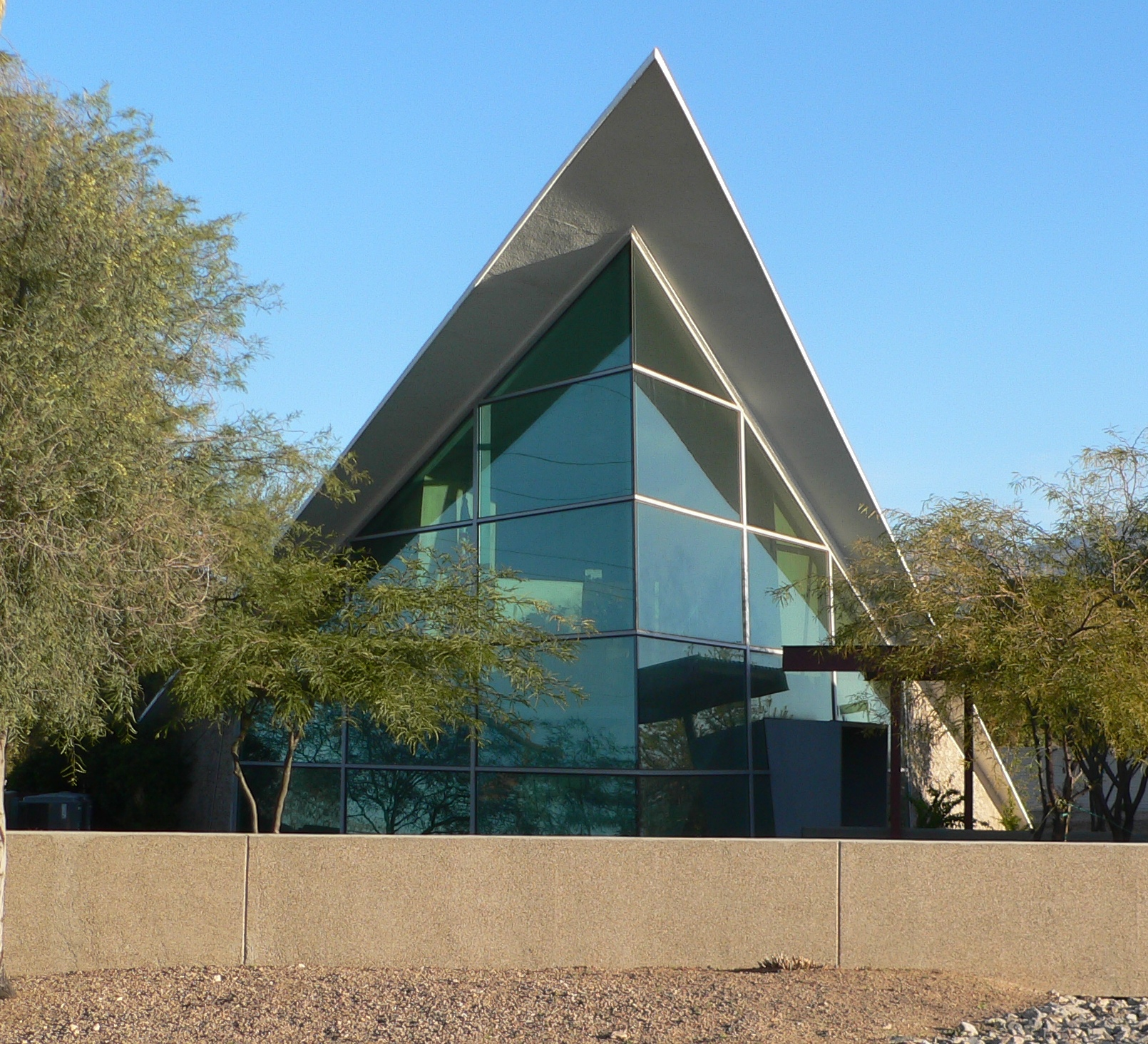
Catalina American Baptist Church

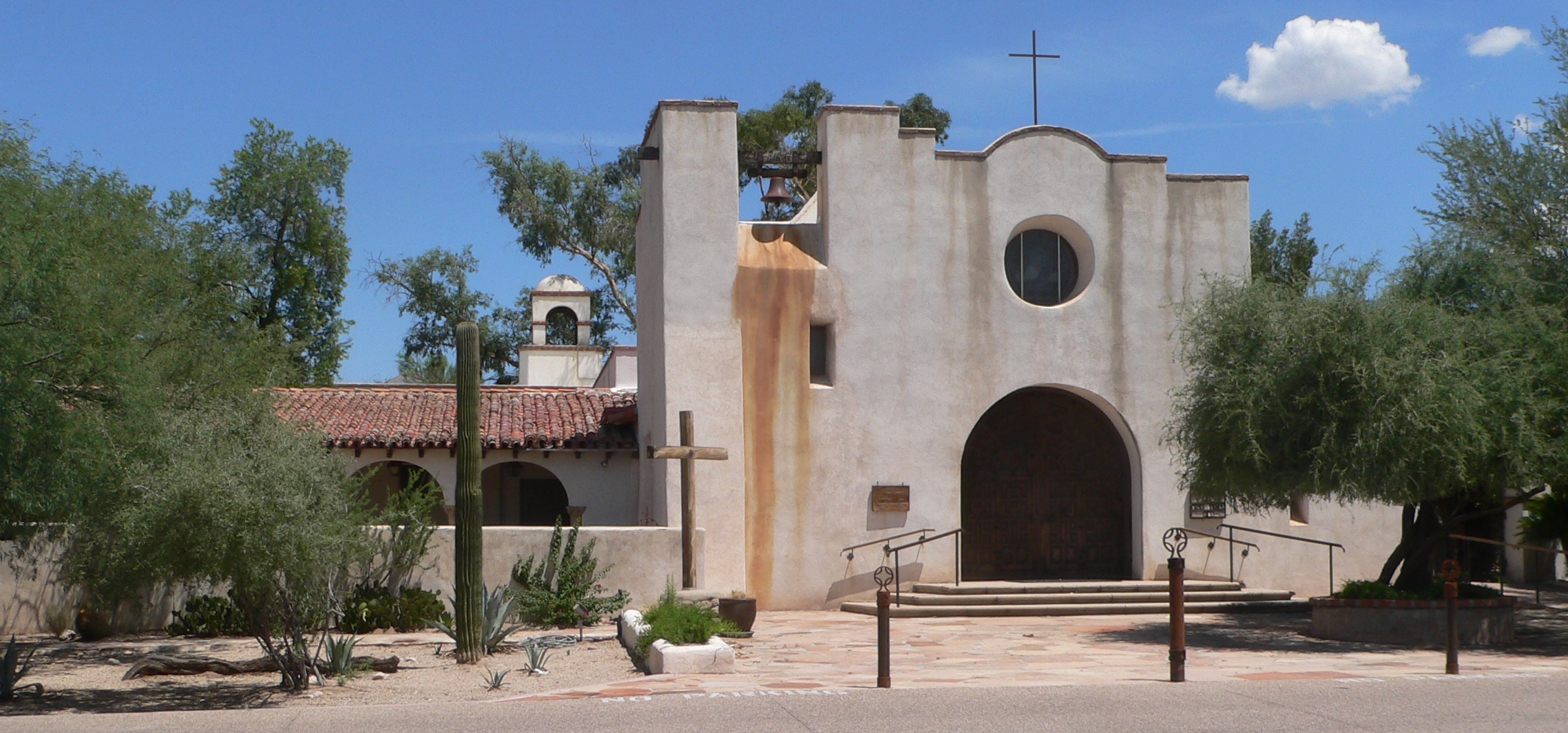
St. Philip's in the Hills Episcopal Church

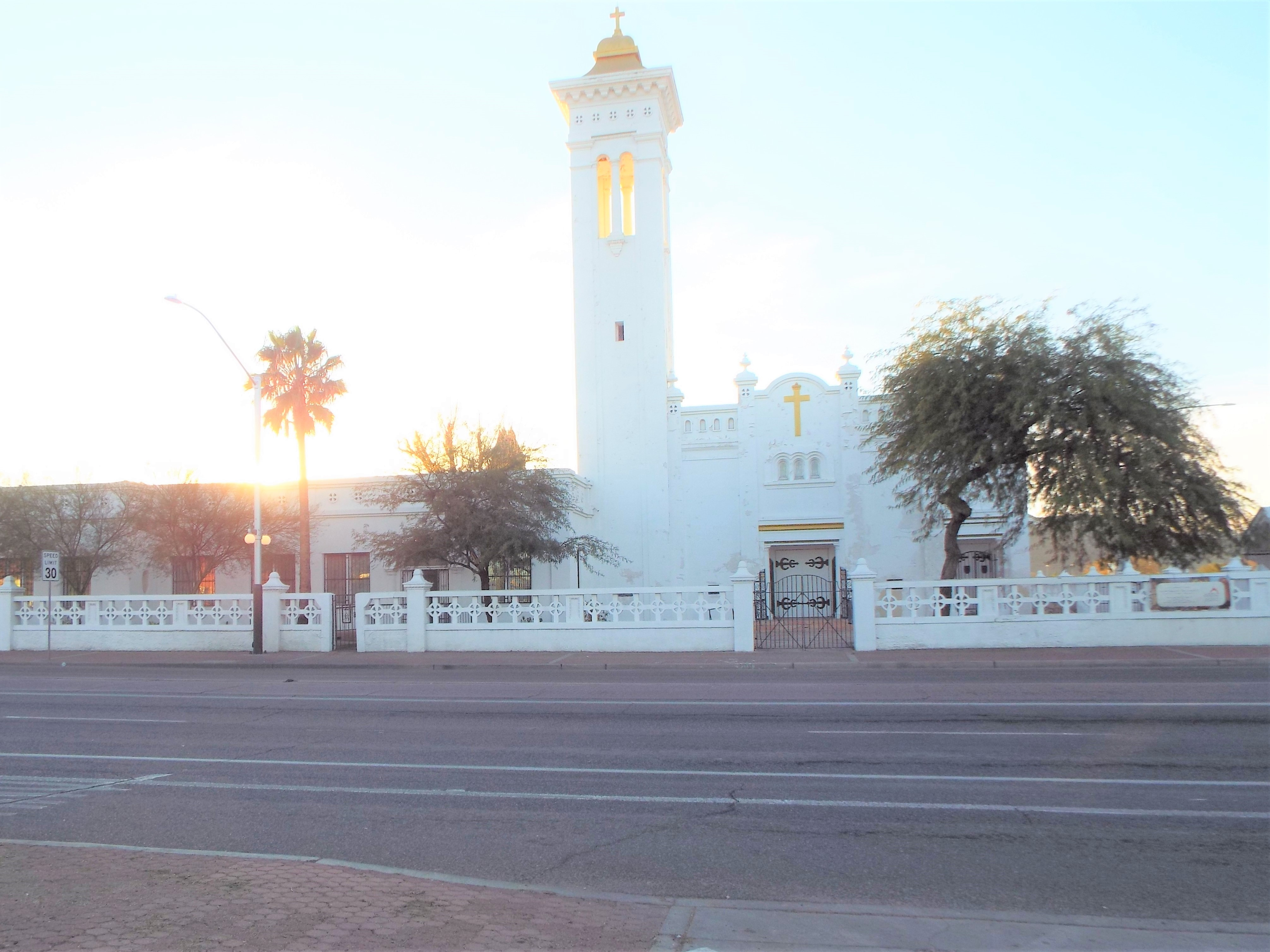
Santa Cruz Catholic Church

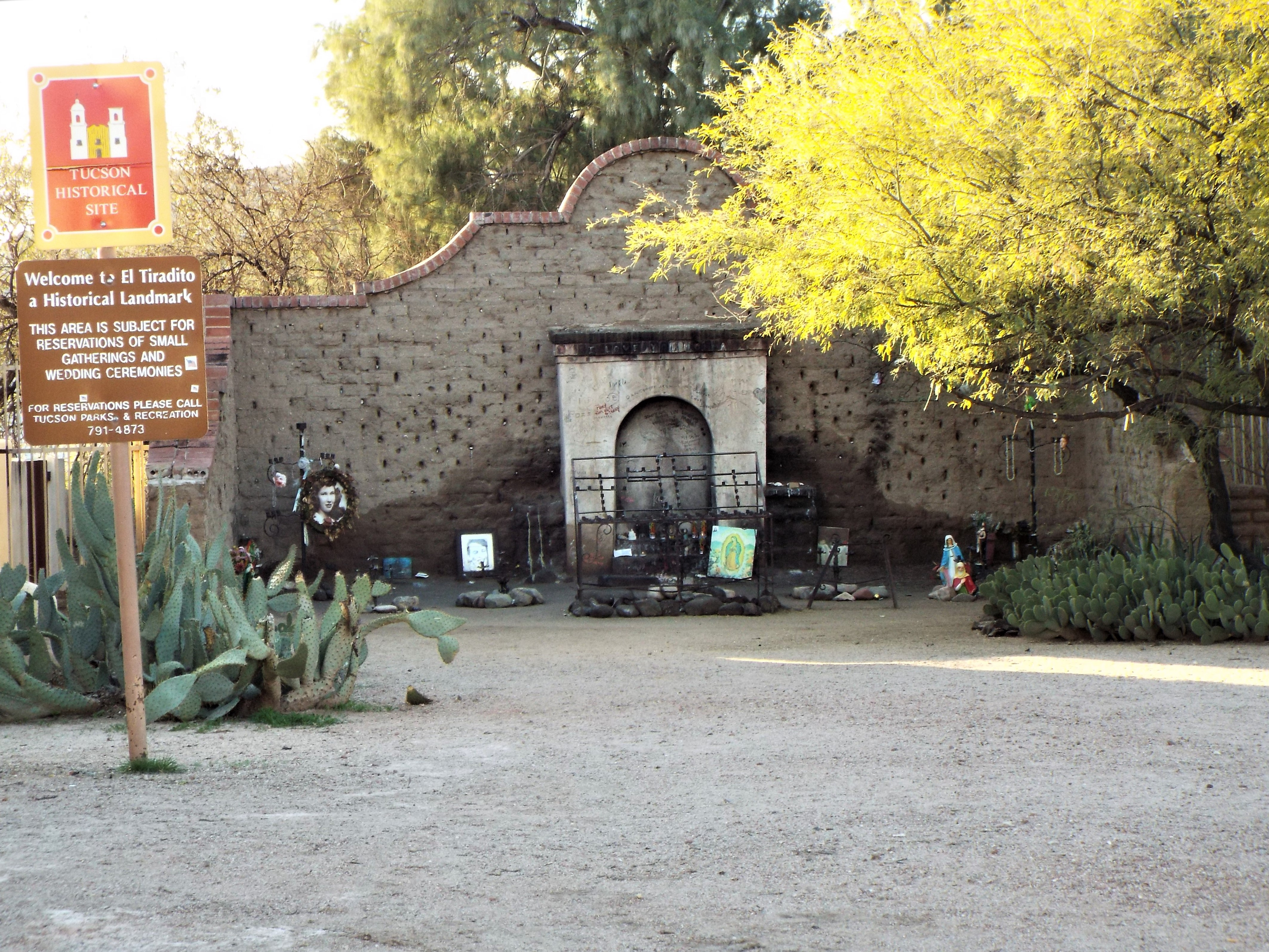
El Tiradito

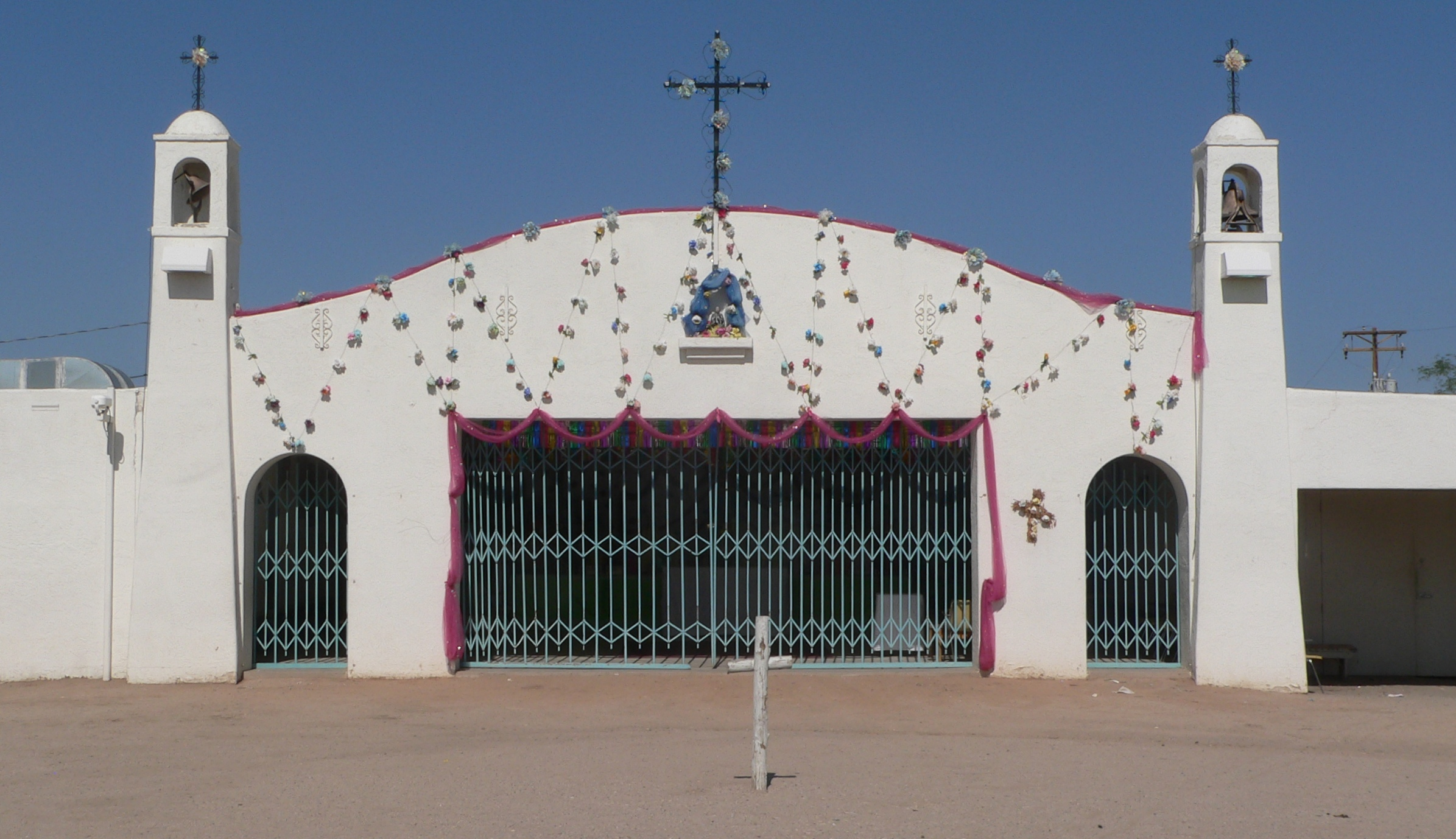
Pascua Cultural Plaza Chapel.

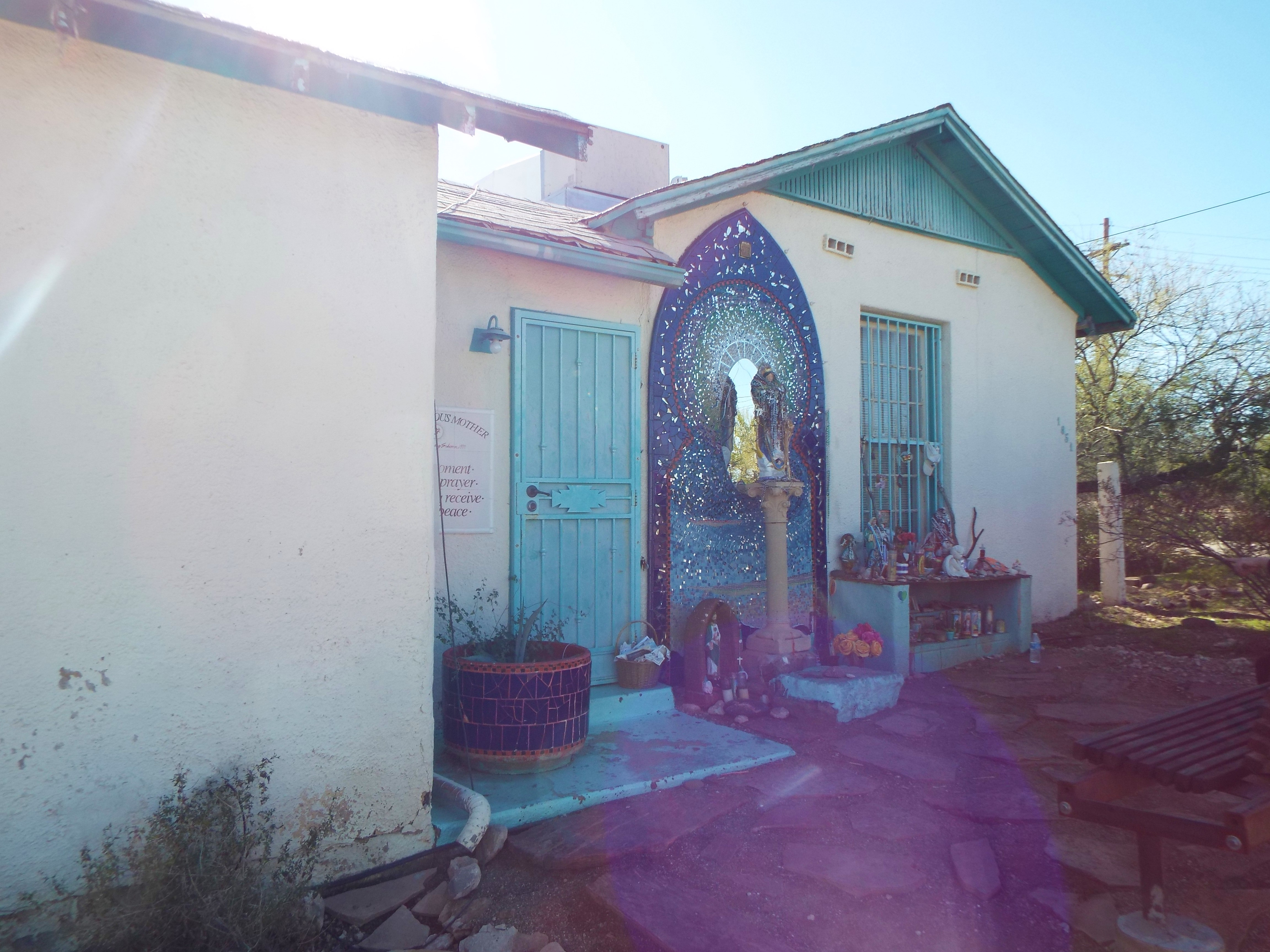
Our Lady of Guadalupe Chapel.

=== Fort Lowell ===
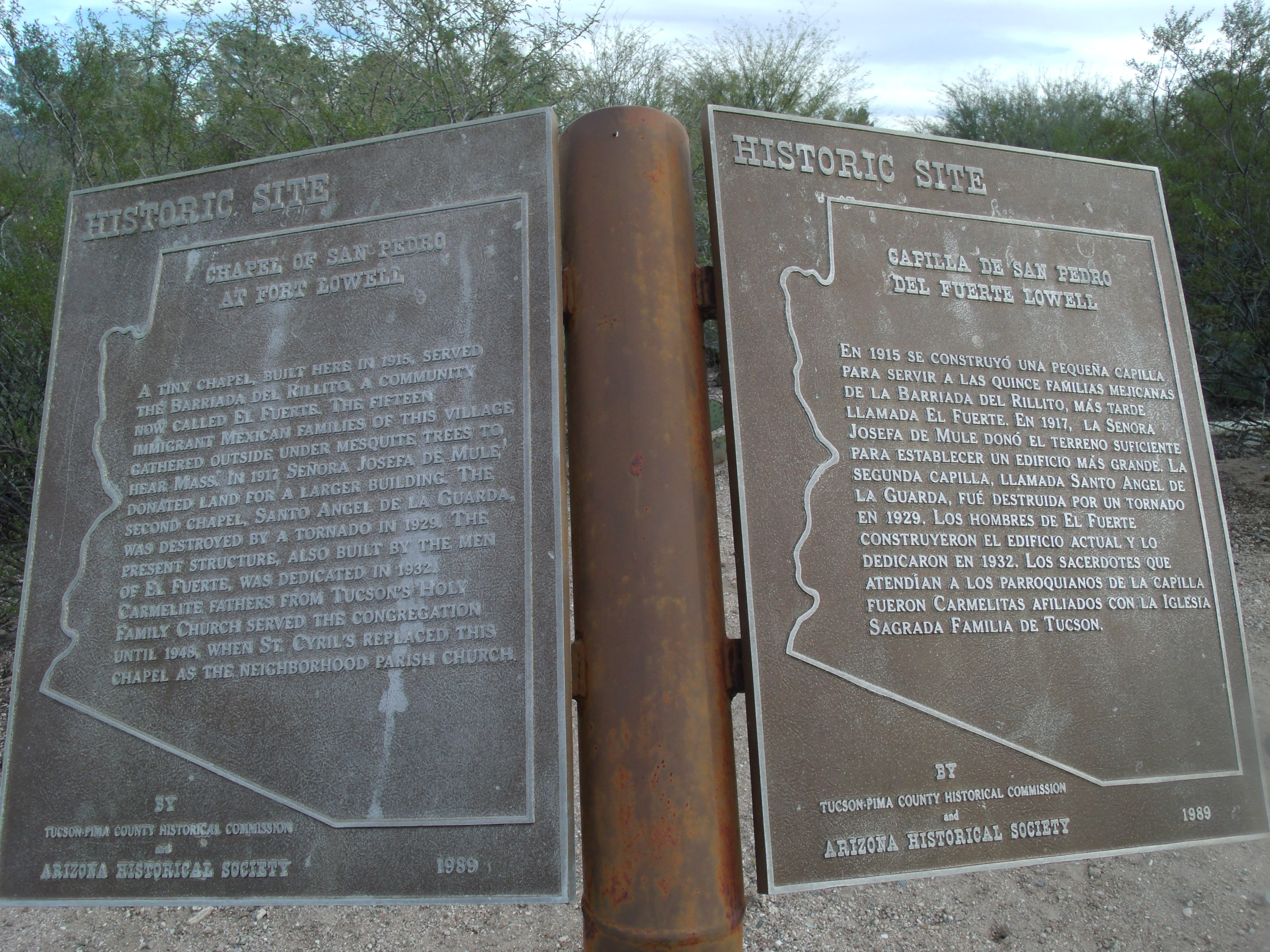
The San Pedro Chapel National Register of Historic Places Marker.

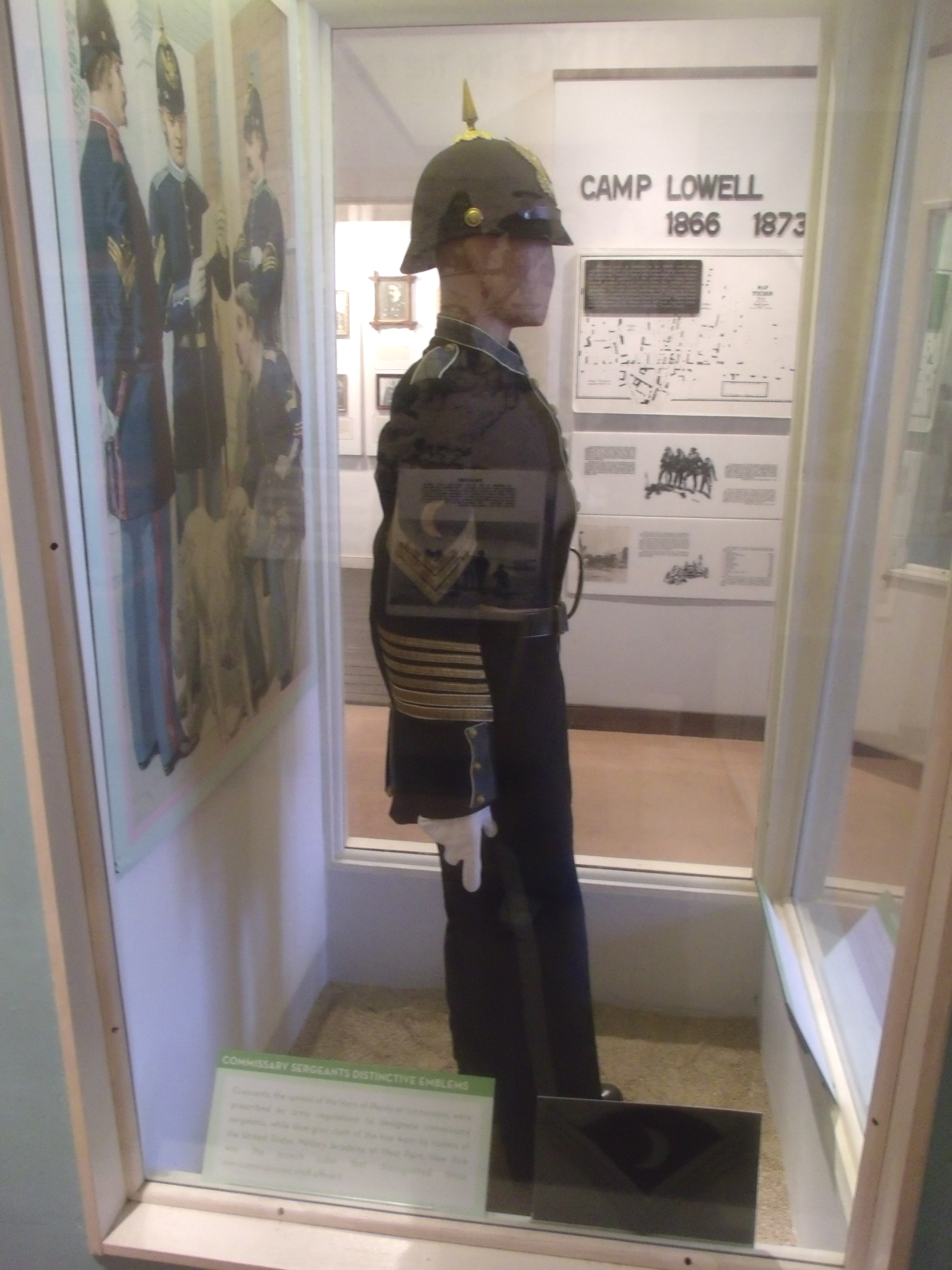
Display of a sergeants uniform in the Fort Lowell Park Museum. The uniform once belonged to a member of the 5th Cavalry.

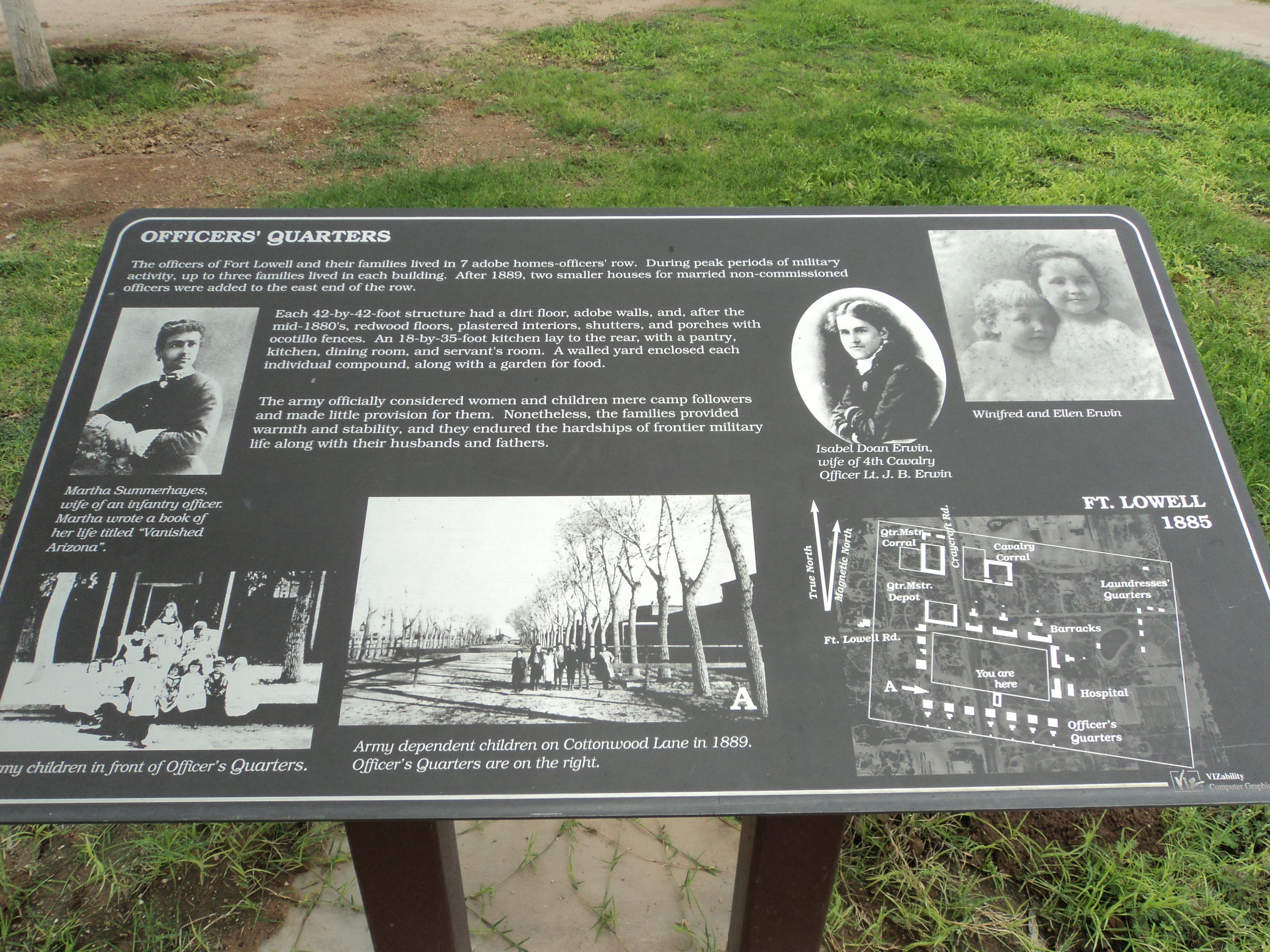
Information board on officers' quarters.

Fort Lowell Park is located at 2900 N Craycroft Road. It was the location of a United States Army post which was active from 1873 to 1891 on the outskirts of Tucson. It is the historical setting of the 1957–1958 syndicated Western television series, Boots and Saddles, starring John M. Pickard, Patrick McVey, and Gardner McKay. Owned by the Catalina Council of the Boy Scouts of America from 1945 to 1957. The historic park is now owned by the city of Tucson. It was listed in the National Register of Historic Places in 1978, ref.: #78003358. The following is a brief description of the images related to the fort.

- The Flagstaff of Fort Lowell – It was the third reconstructed flagpole in the place where the original one once stood. This particular one was erected in 2007 and is located within the Fort Lowell Park.
- The reconstructed Commanding Officer's Kitchen.
- The Fort Lowell Hospital ruins. The hospital was built in 1878.
- The adobe ruins of the Fort Lowell kitchen. The kitchen was built in 1879.
- The adobe ruins of the Band Quarters which was built in 1879.
- The adobe ruins of Soldier Barracks which were built in 1878.
- The Fort Lowell Officer's Quarter's was built in 1873. The restored Officer's Quarter's was listed in the National Register of Historic Places in 1978, ref.: #78003366.
- The Fort Lowell Quartermaster's Quarters was built in 1873. The restored Quartermaster's Quarter was listed in the National Register of Historic Places in 1978, ref.: #78003370.
- The Fort Lowell Post Traders Storeand Riallito House called Las Saetas was built c. 1875 and is located at 5425 E. Fort Lowell Rd. It was listed in the National Register of Historic Places in 1978, ref.: #78003367.
- The Fort Lowell Quartermaster's Storehouse was built c. 1875 and is located at 5479 E. Fort Lowell Rd. It was listed in the National Register of Historic Places in 1978, ref.: #78003369.
- The San Pedro Chapel was built in 1932 and is located at 5230 E. Ft. Lowell Rd.. The original chapel that was built in this location in 1915 and was destroyed by a tornado in 1929. The current San Pedro Chapel was built over the ruins of the destroyed chapel and was dedicated in 1932. Both chapels were constructed by the El Fuerte community. The San Pedro Chapel, also known as San Pedro de Fort Lowell (St. Peter's at Fort Lowell Mission), was listed in the National Register of Historic Places on April 28, 1993, ref.: #93000306. It is also listed as a City Historic Landmark.
- The Fort Lowell Park Museum located in Fort Lowell Park. The museum has various displays. The display pictured is that of a sergeants uniform. The uniform once belonged to a member of the 5th Cavalry.
- The Cavalry Corrals – built in 1873 and located at N. Craycroft Boulevard. listed in the National Register of Historic Places on December 13, 1978, ref.: #78003359.
- The Post Trader's Storehouse – built in 1875 and located at 5354 E. Fort Lowell Rd. listed in the National Register of Historic Places on December 13, 1978, ref.: #78003368.
- The Charles Bolsius House Site No. HD 5-26 – built in 1873 and located at 5495 E. Fort Lowell Rd. listed in the National Register of Historic Places on December 13, 1978, ref.: #78003360.
- Site Nos. HD 5-28/5-25 – built in 1875 and located at 3031 N. Craycroft Boulevard. listed in the National Register of Historic Places on December 13. 1978, ref.: #78003364.
Historic Fort Lowell

Statue of cavalry soldier at Fort Lowell Park.

(NRHP = National Register of Historic Places)
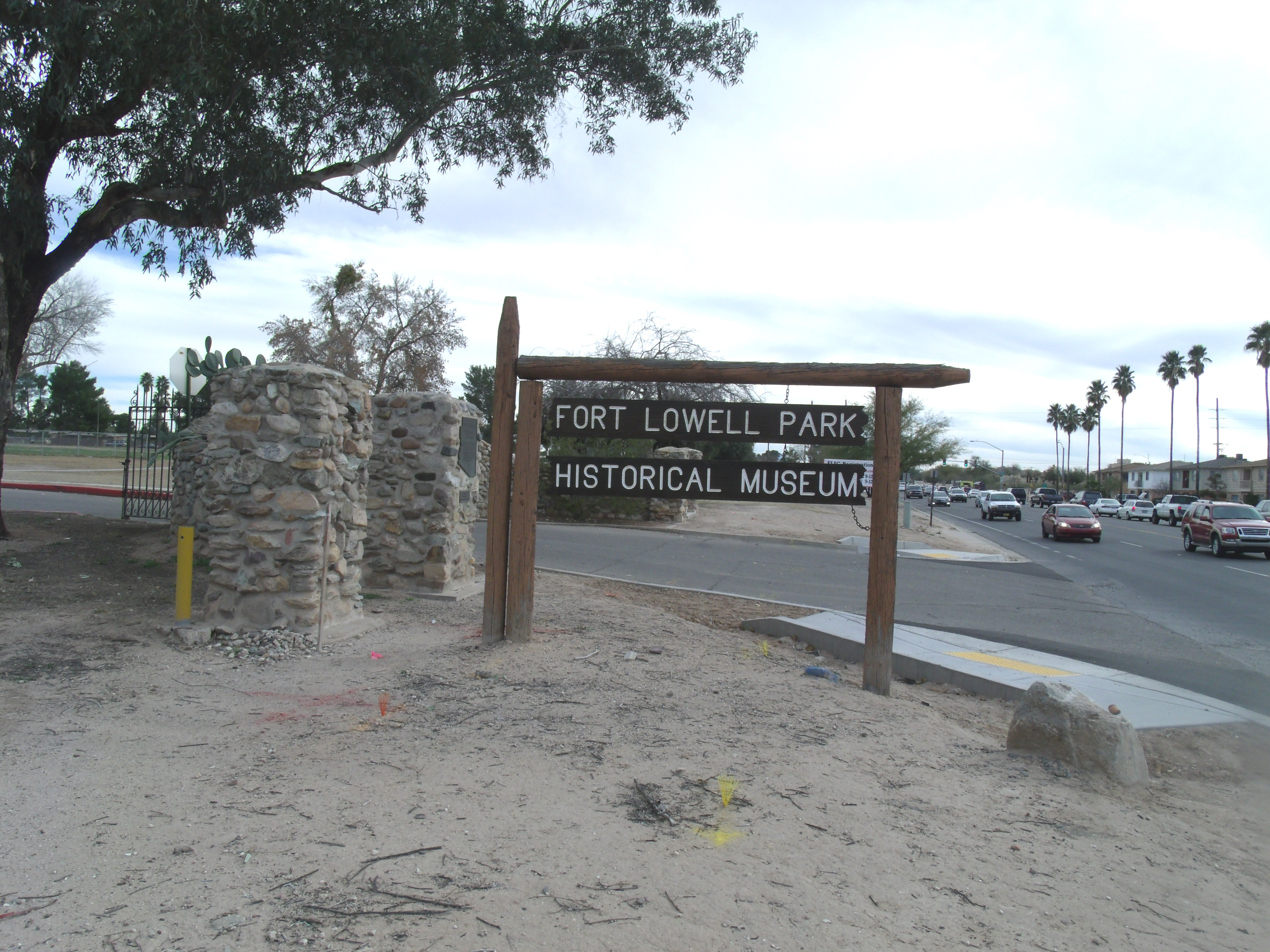
The entrance of Fort Lowell Park.

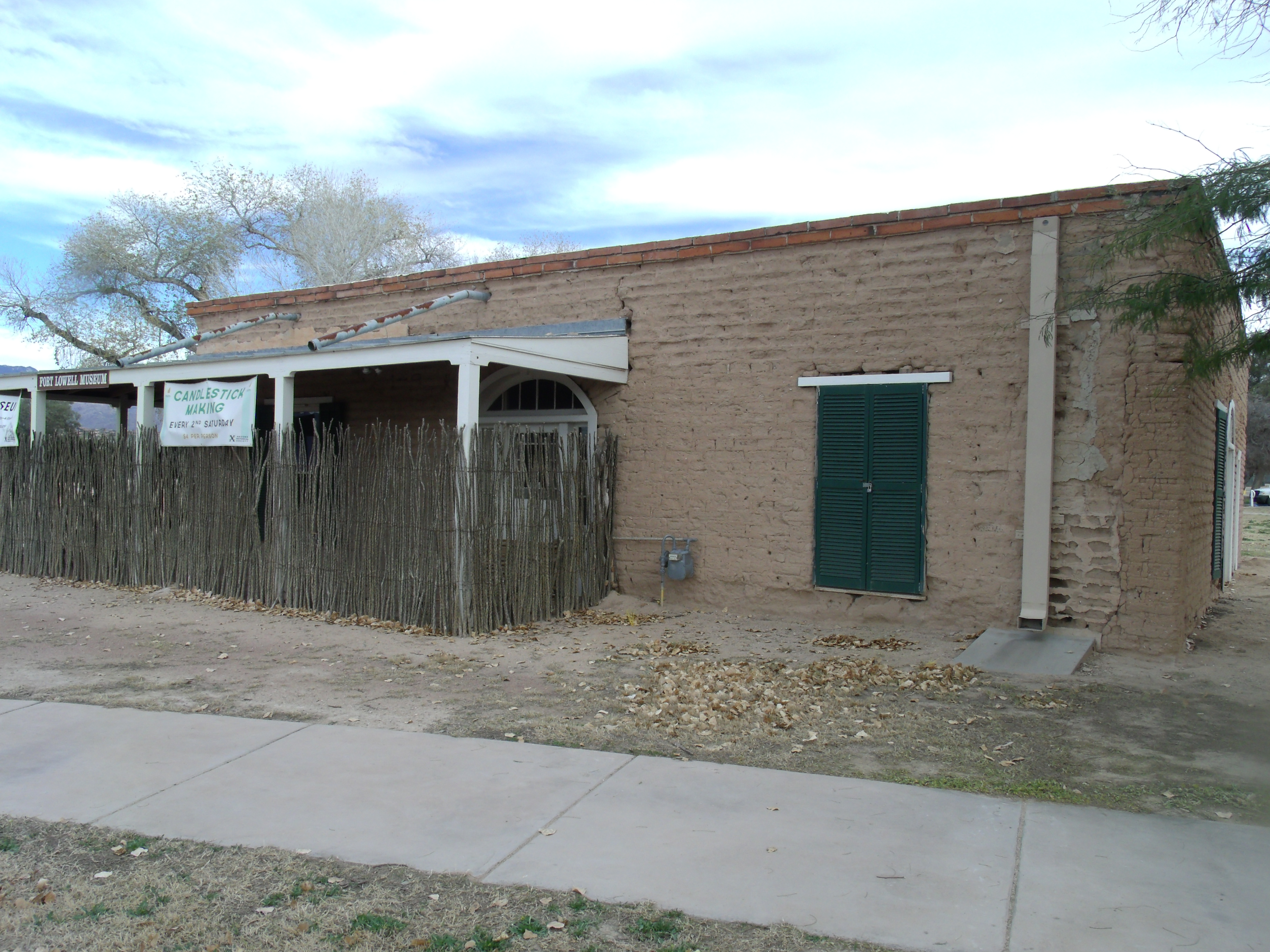
The Fort Lowell Park Museum.

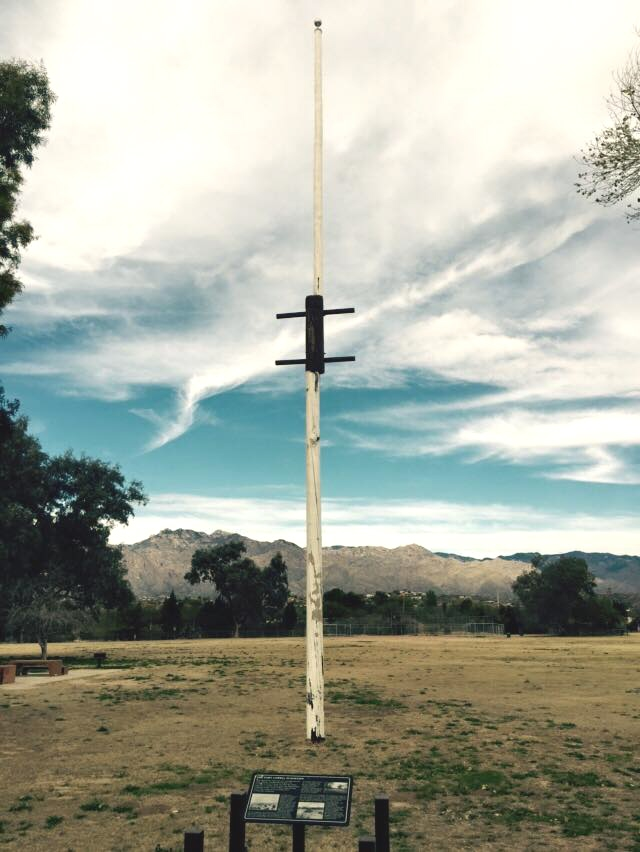
This is the third reconstructed flagstaff of Fort Lowell.

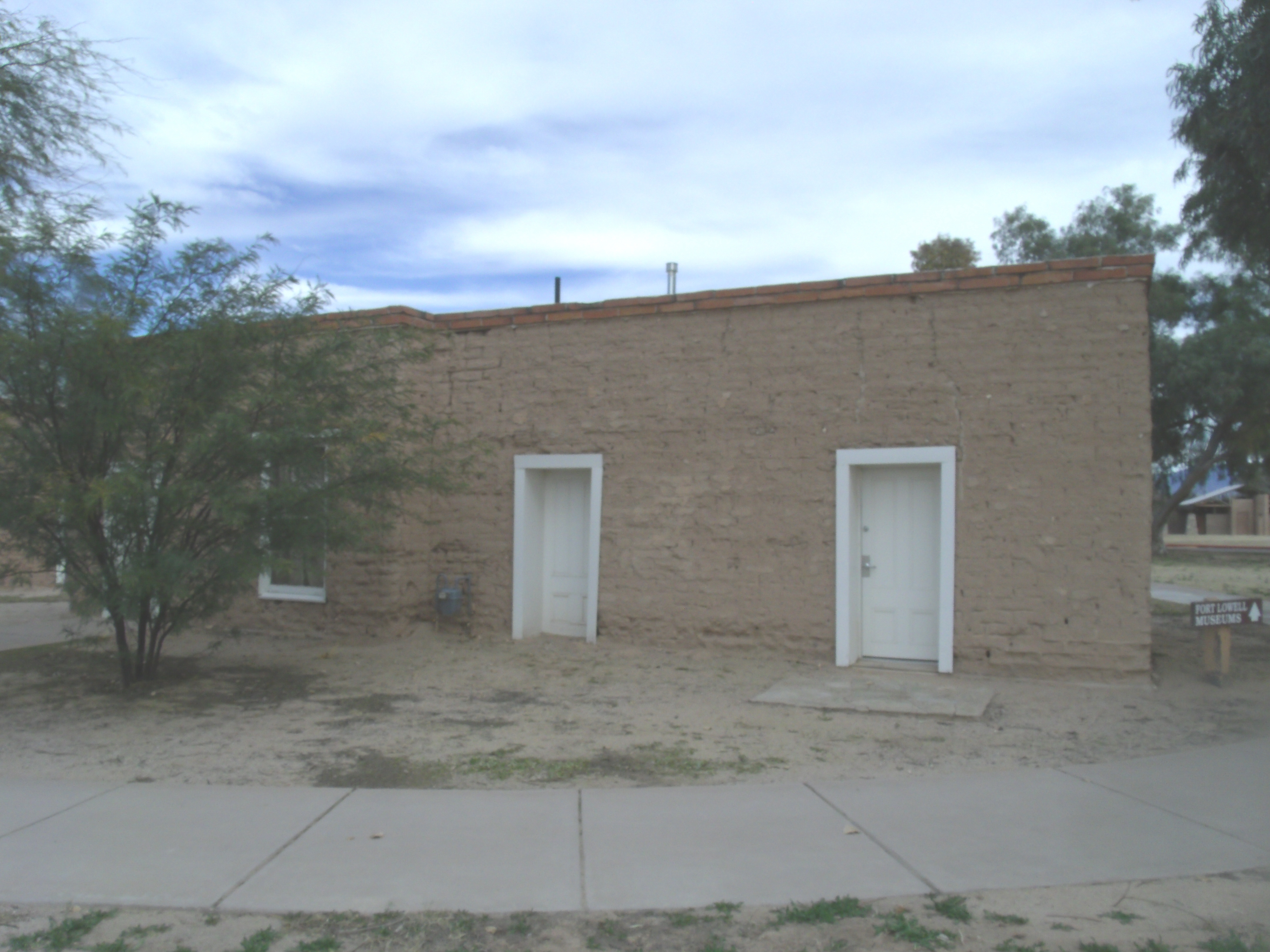
The Commanding Officer's Kitchen

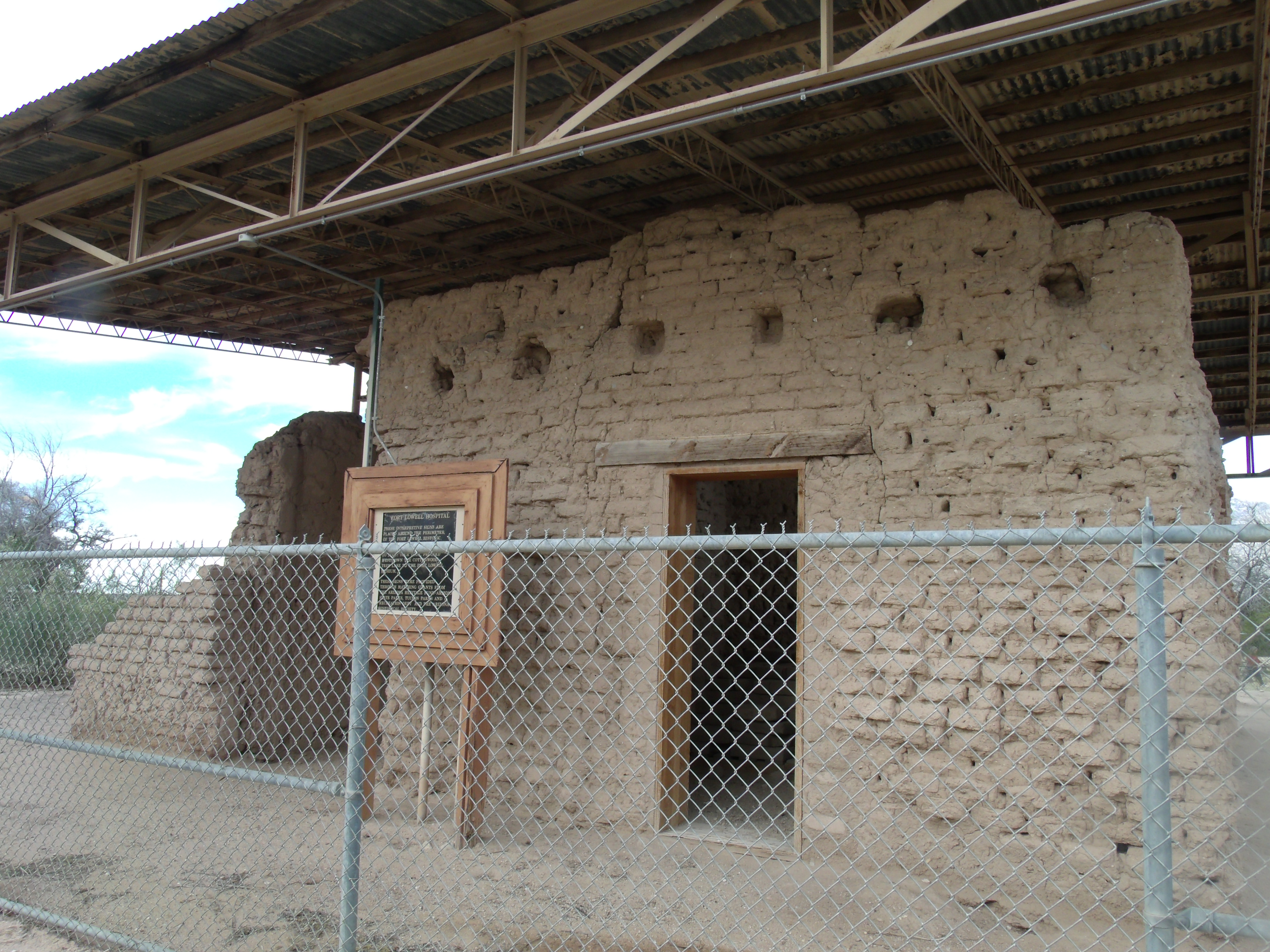
The Fort Lowell Hospital ruins.

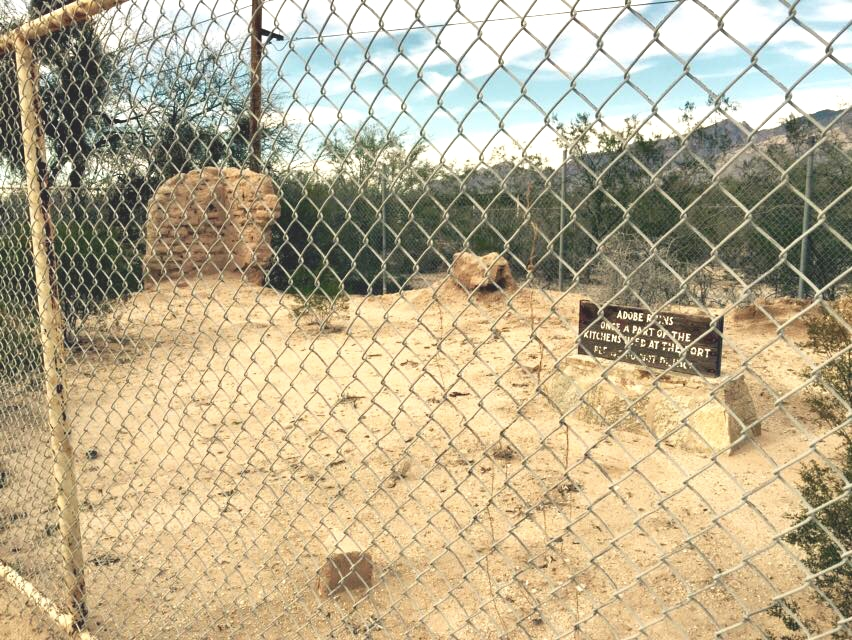
The adobe ruins of the Fort Lowell Kitchen.

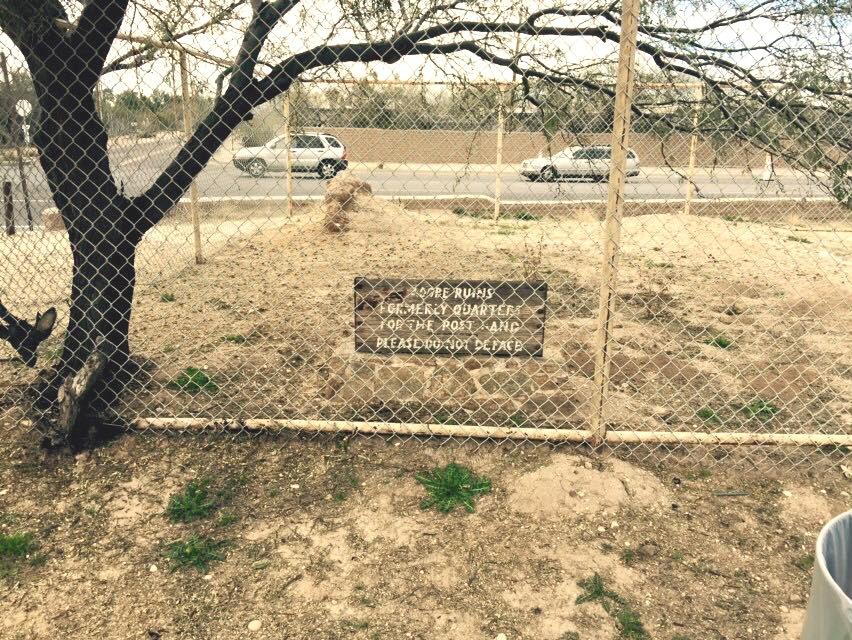
The adobe ruins of the Band Quarters.

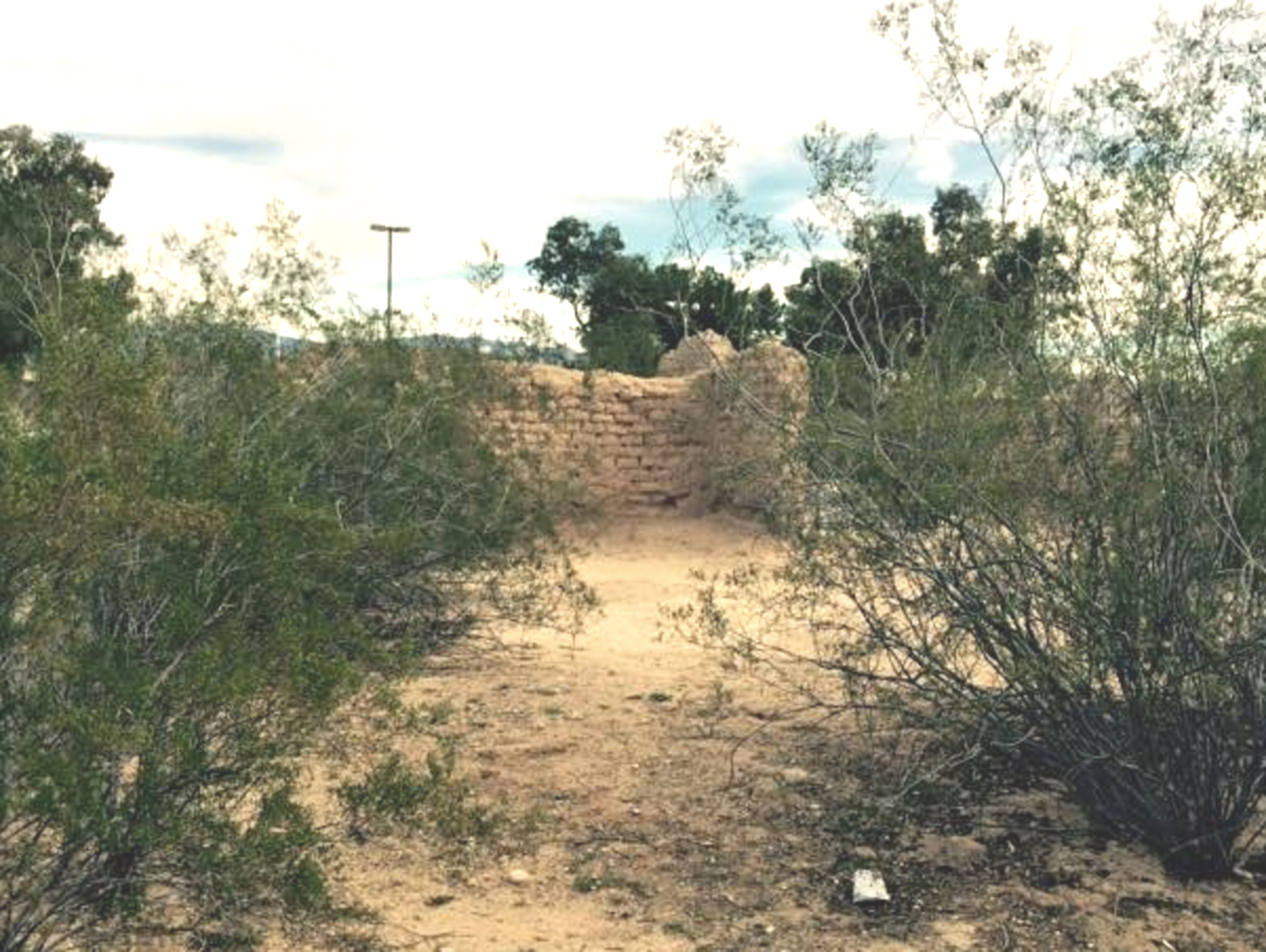
The adobe ruins of the Soldier Barracks.

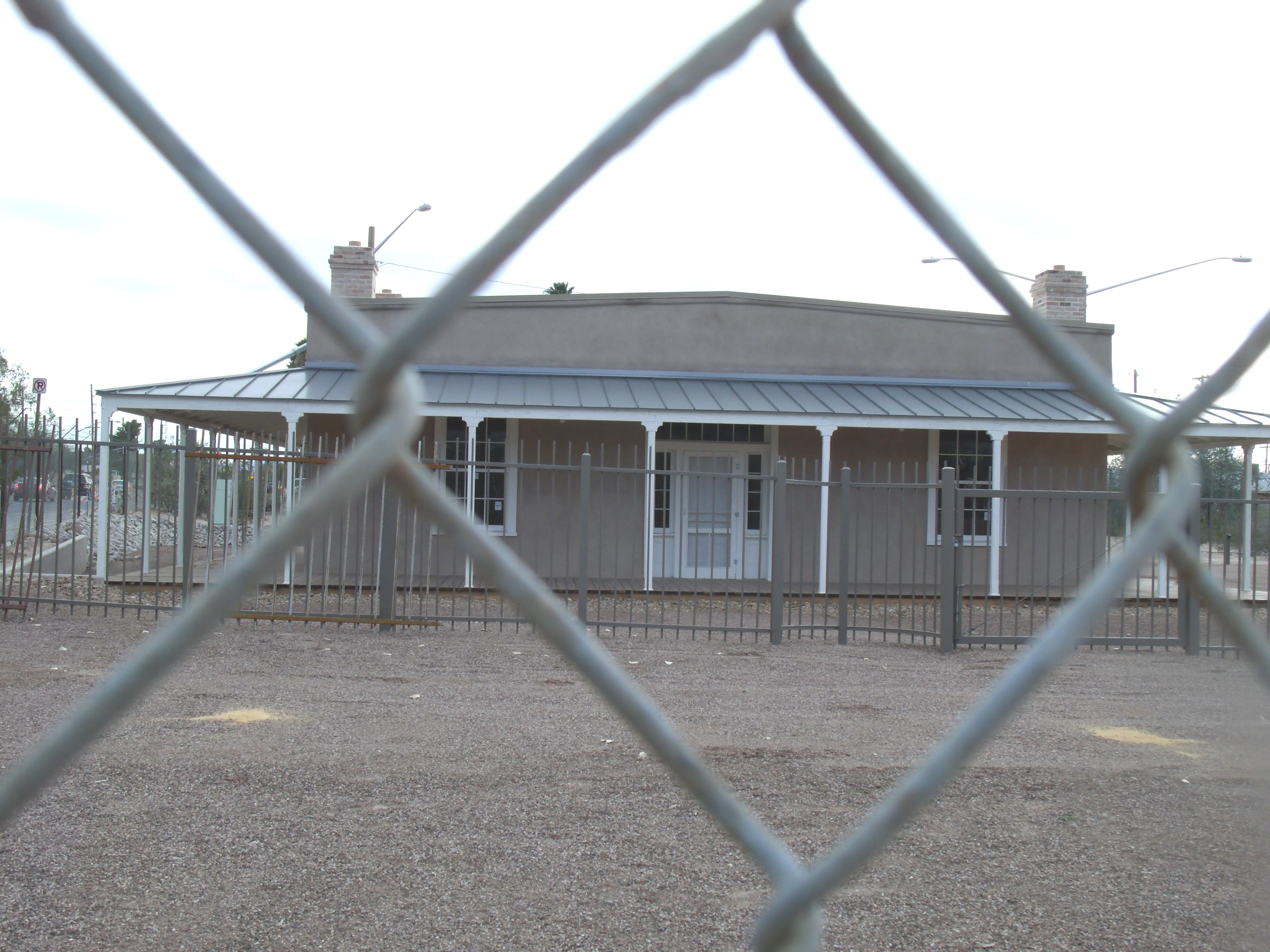
The Fort Lowell Officer's Quarter's.

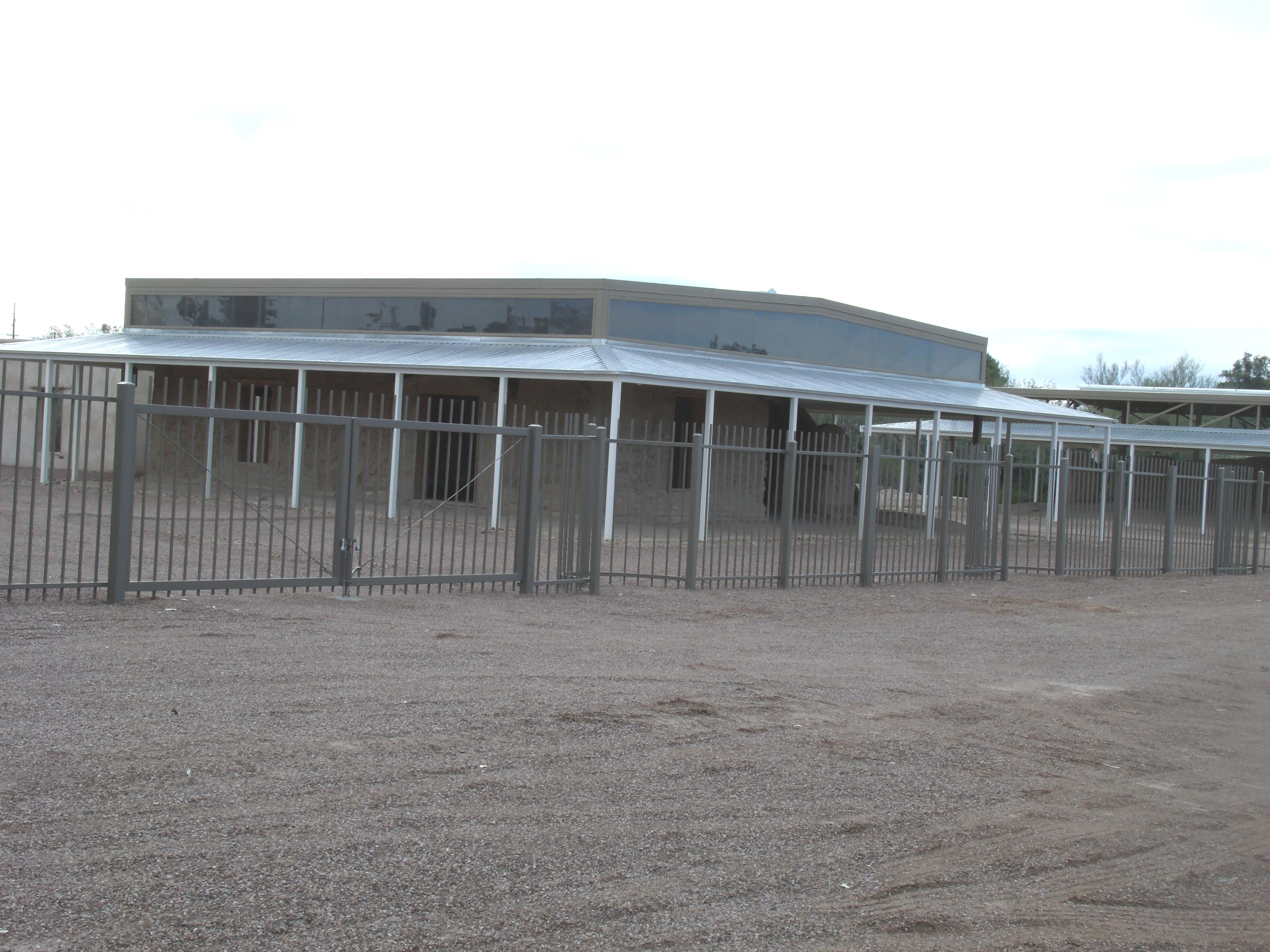
The Fort Lowell Quartermaster's Quarters.

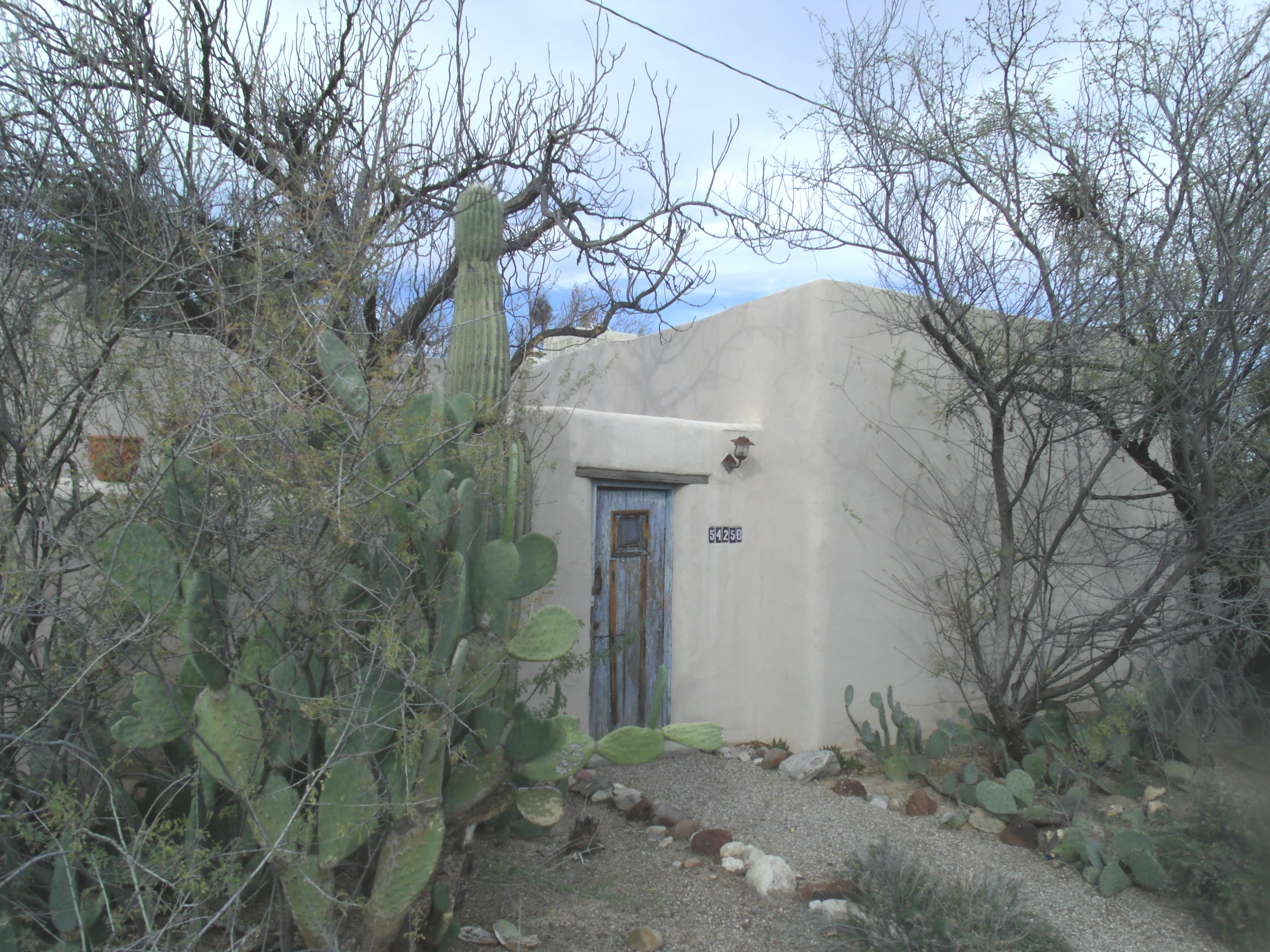
The Fort Lowell Post Traders Store and Riallito House.

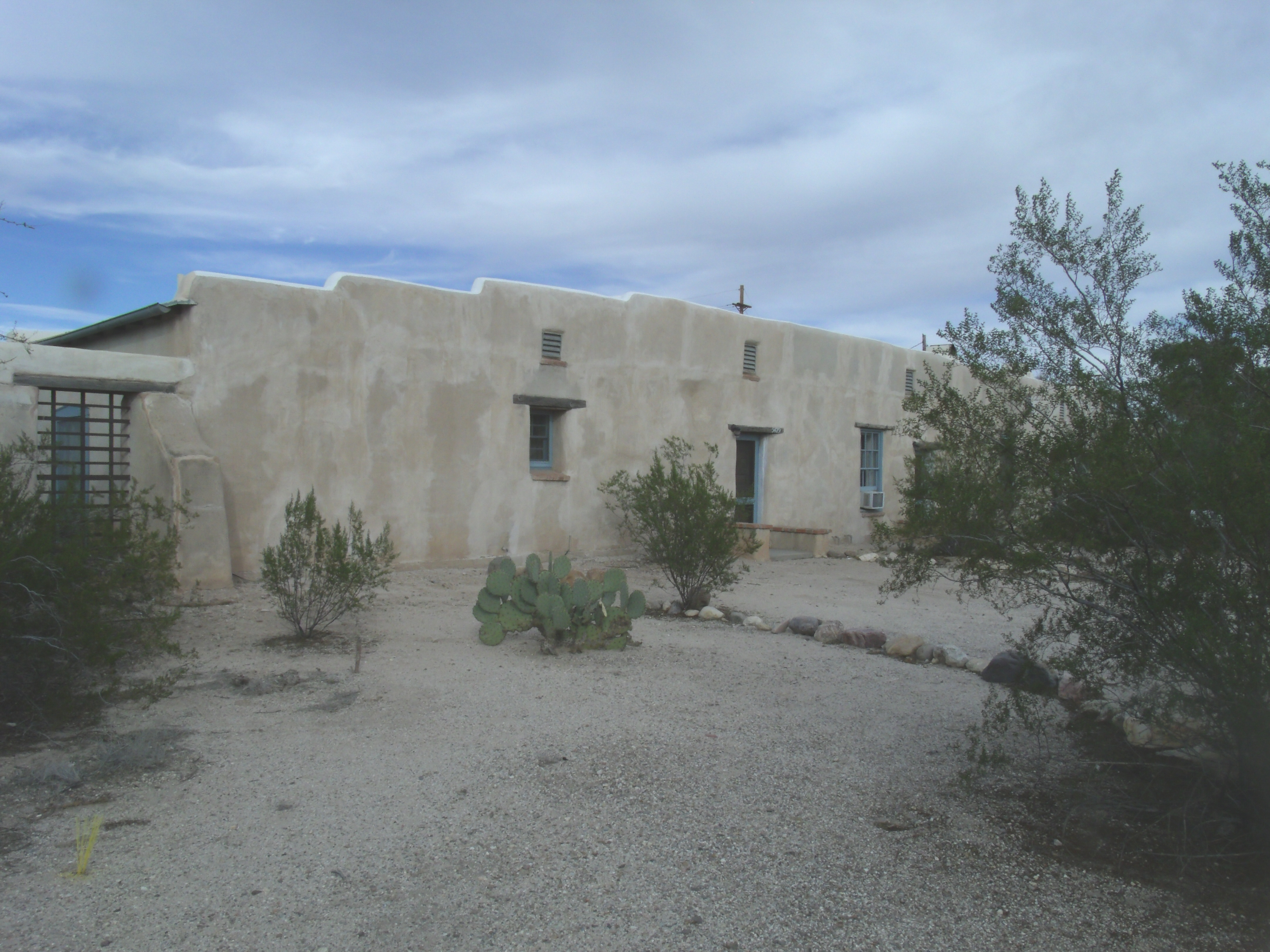
The Fort Lowell Quartermaster's Storehouse.

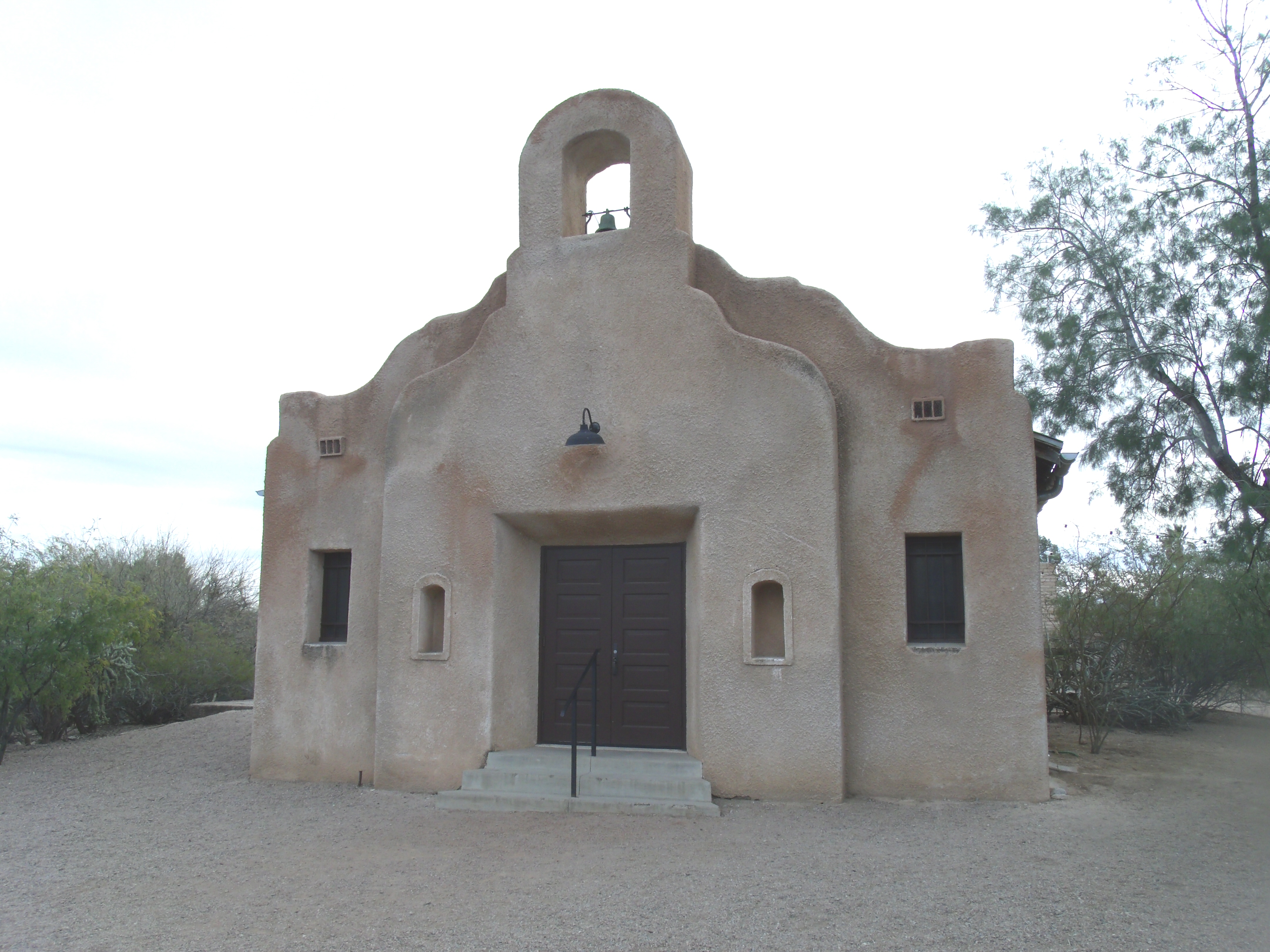
The San Pedro Chapel.

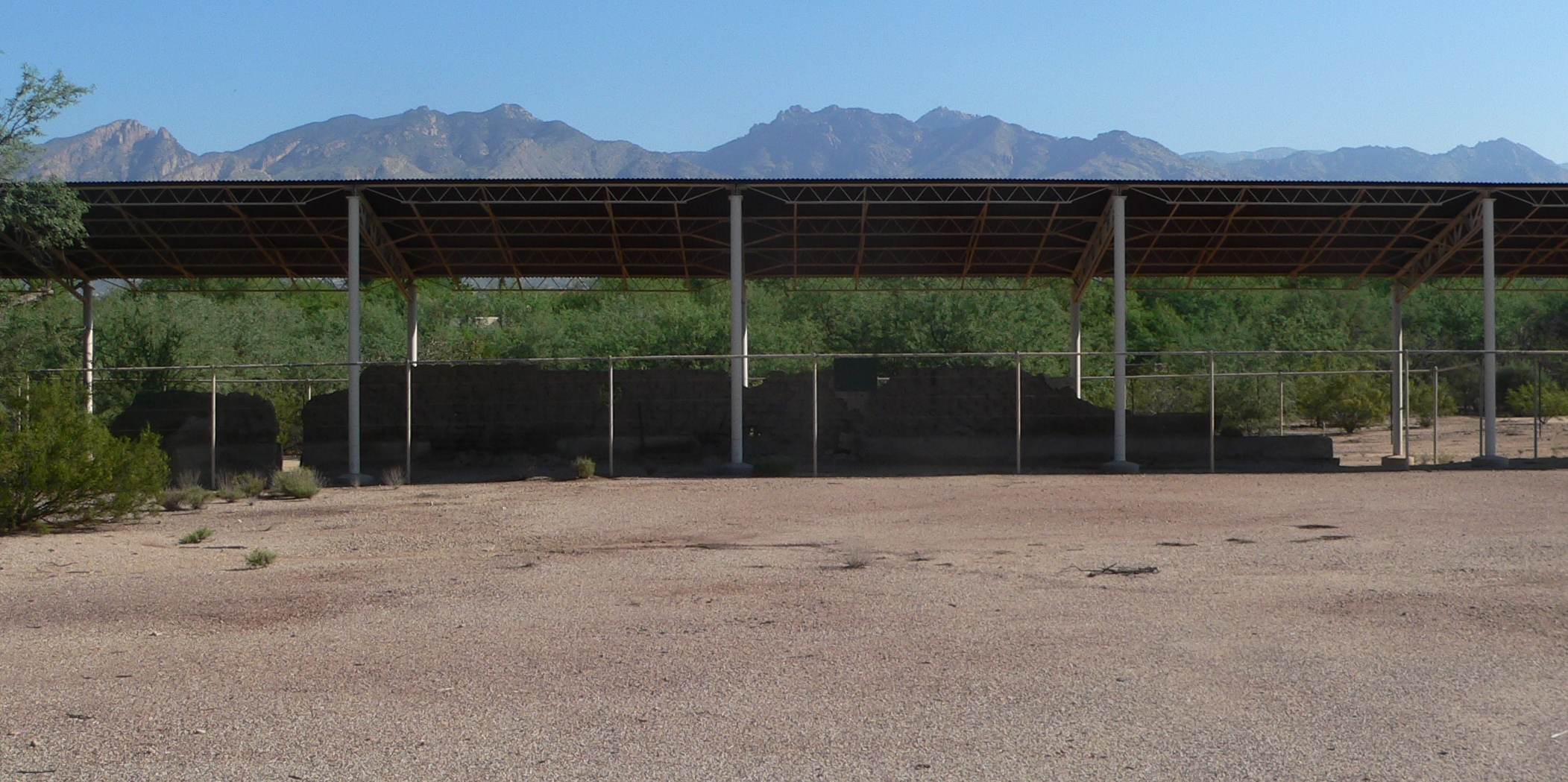
The Cavalry Corrals.

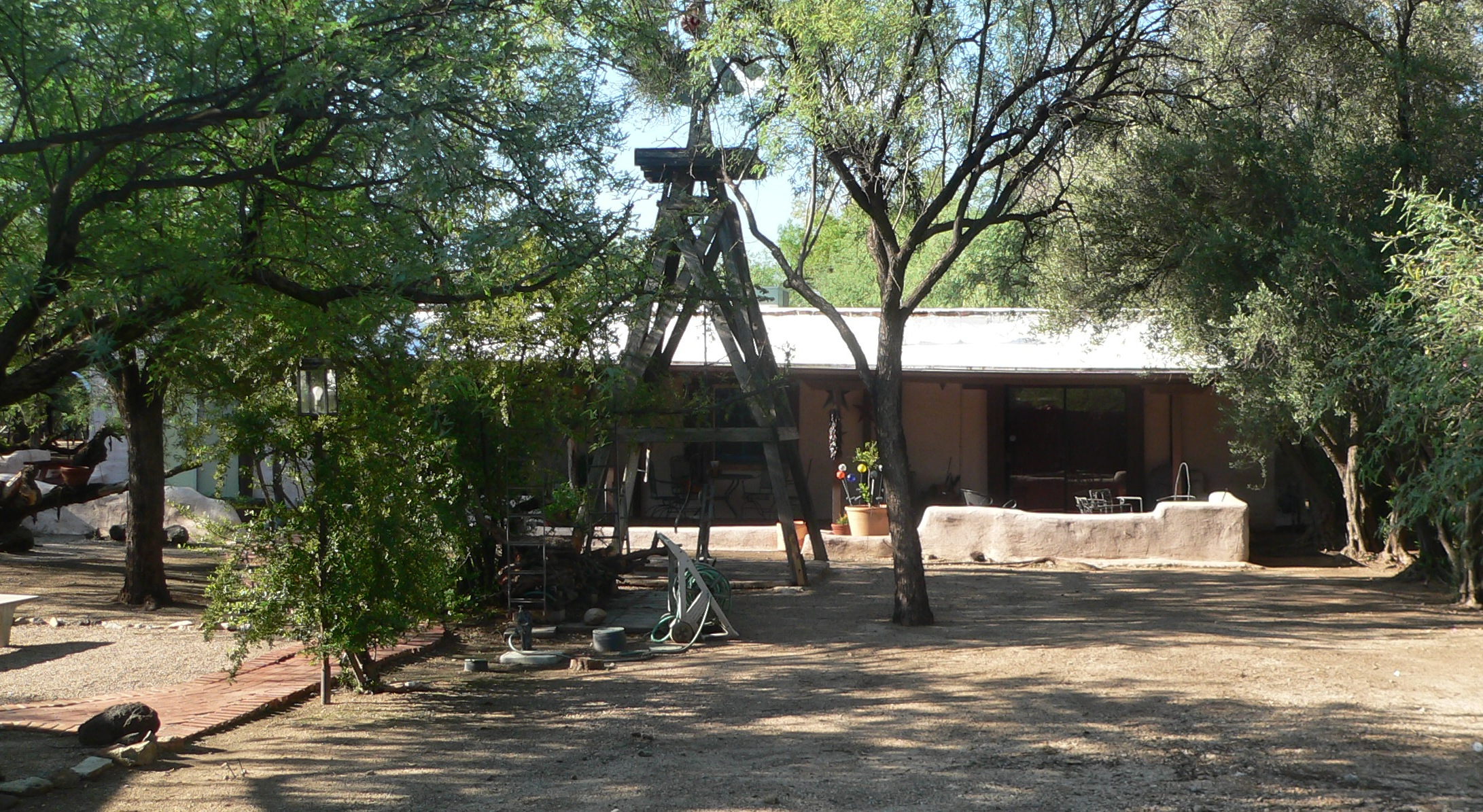
Post Trader's Storehouse.

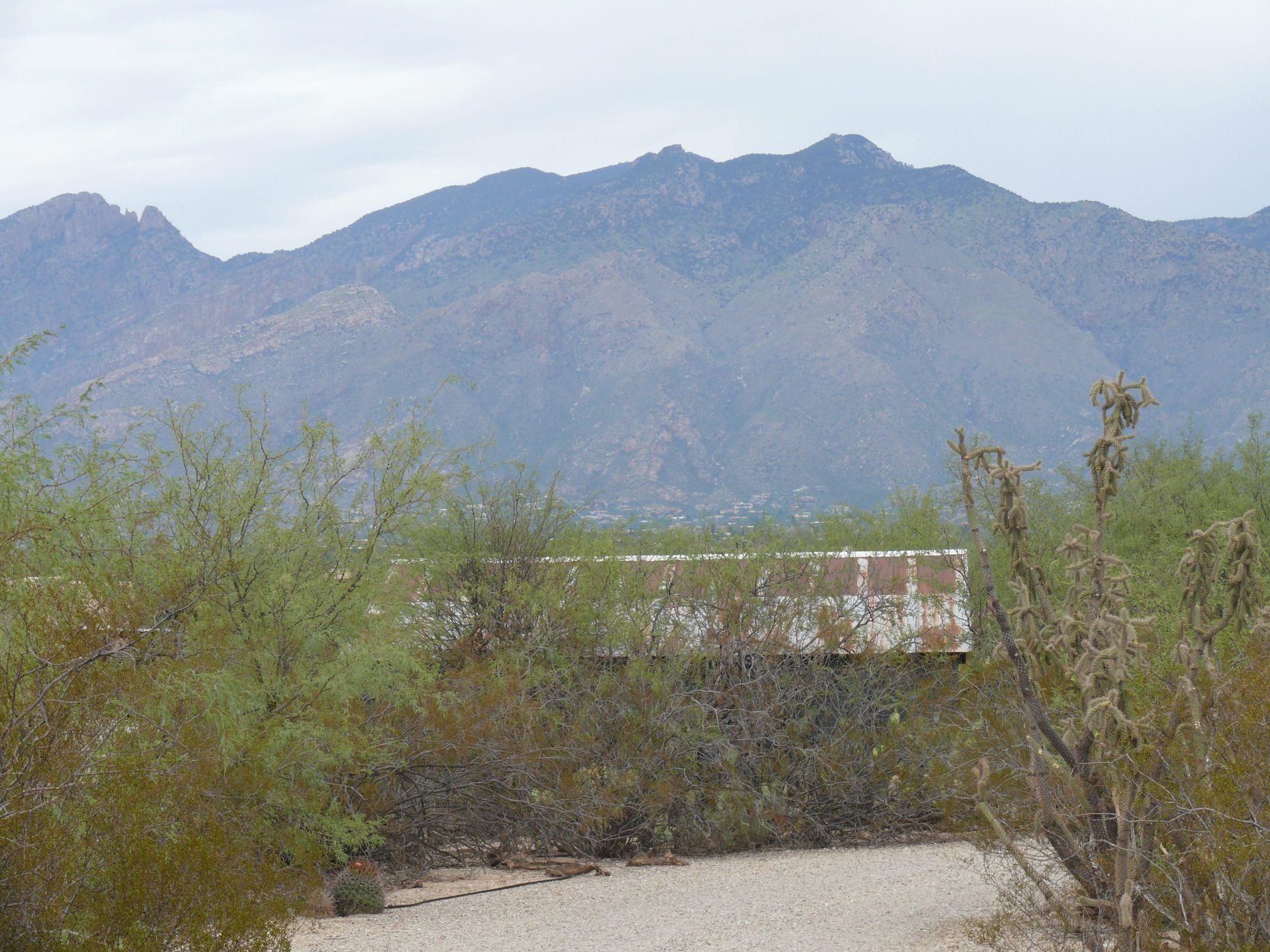
Site No. HD 5-26.

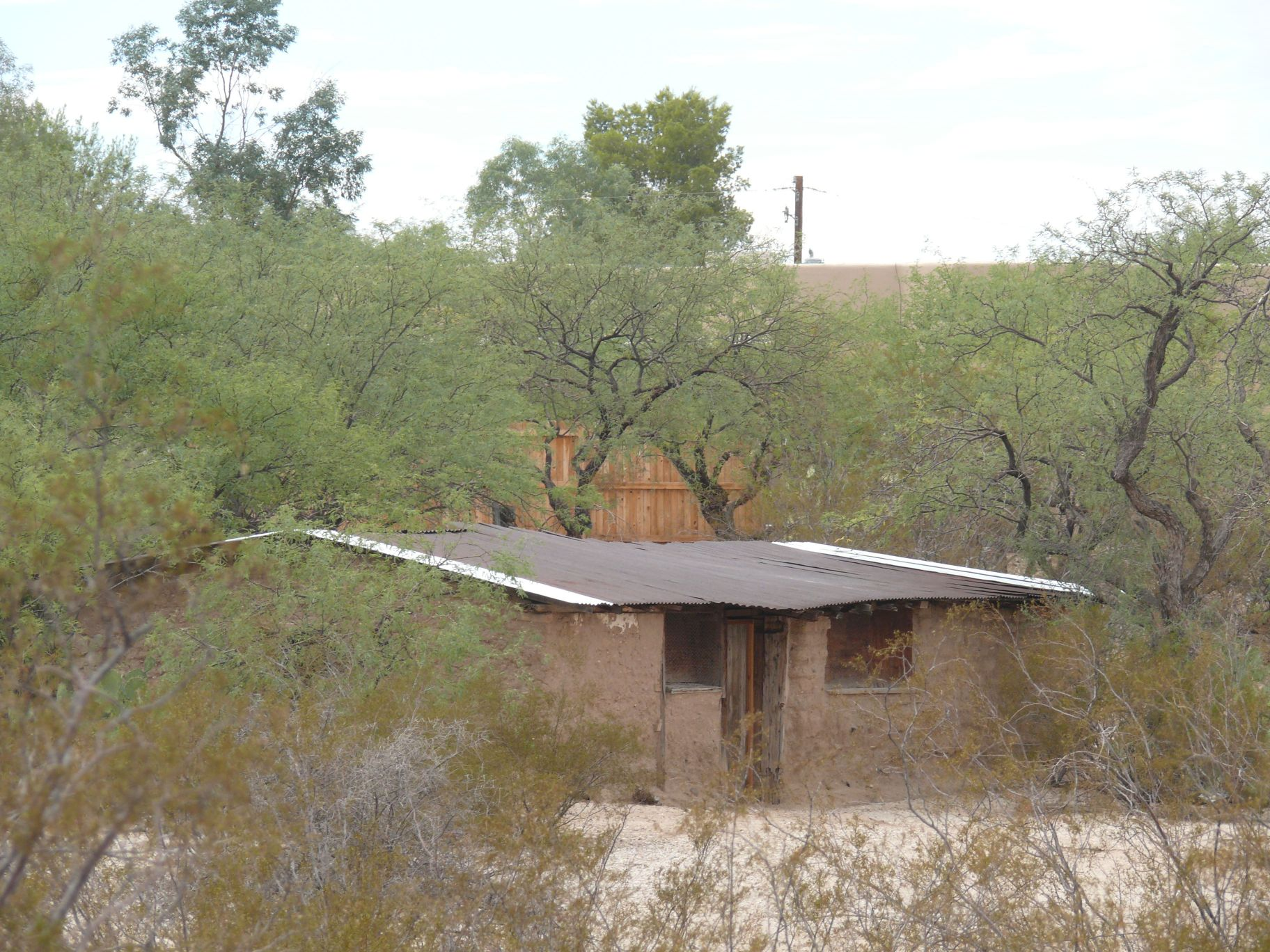
Site Nos. HD 5-28/5-25.

The following historic sites are not pictured in this list:

- The Quartermaster's Corrals – built in 1873 and located at N. Craycroft Rd. was listed on the National Register of Historic Places on December 13. 1978, ref.: #78003370.
- Site No. HD 4-8A – built in 1873 and located at E. Fort Lowell Rd. was listed in the National Register of Historic Places on December 13. 1978, ref.: #78003374.
- Site No. HD 7-0A – built in 1875 and located at 5429 E. Fort Lowell Rd. was listed in the National Register of Historic Places on December 13. 1978, ref.: #78003361.
- Site No. HD 7-13 – built in 1873 and located at 5531 E. Fort Lowell Rd. was listed in the National Register of Historic Places on December 13. 1978, ref.: #78003365.
- Site Nos. HD 9-11/9-2 – built in 1875 and located at 5651 E. Fort Lowell Rd. was listed in the National Register of Historic Places on December 13. 1978, ref.: #78003362.
- Site No. HD 9-28 – built in 1875 and located at 5668 E. Fort Lowell Rd. was listed in the National Register of Historic Places on December 13. 1978, ref.: #78003363.
- Site Nos. HD 12-4/12-8 – built in 1873 and located at E. Fort Lowell Rd. was listed in the National Register of Historic Places on December 13. 1978, ref.: #78003375.
- Site No. HD 13-4 – built in 1873 and located at N. Craycroft Boulevard was listed in the National Register of Historic Places on December 13. 1978, ref.: #78003376.
- Site No. HD 13-11 – built in 1973 and located at E. Fort Lowell Rd. was listed in the National Register of Historic Places on December 13. 1978, ref.: #78003373.
- Site No. HD 13-13 – built in 1873 and located at E. Fort Lowell Rd. was listed in the National Register of Historic Places on December 13. 1978, ref.: #78003372 .

=== Miscellaneous ===
Among the miscellaneous items pictured that are of historical significance are the following:

- The Southern Pacific Railroad Locomotive No. 1673. It is a standard gauge 2–6–0, Mogul type M-4 class, steam locomotive built in 1900 by Schenectady Locomotive Works. It had a brief starring role in the 1954 film Oklahoma, for which it was fitted with a diamond stack and other turn of the century equipment and colors. It was also the star of Southern Pacific's 75th anniversary in Tucson, Arizona. The locomotive is on display in the Southern Arizona Transportation Museum, 414 N. Toole Ave.. It was listed in the National Register of Historic Places on January 9, 1992, ref.: #91001918.
- The USS Arizona Bell. The salvaged 1,820-pound bell is one of two salvaged from the USS Arizona and is housed in the "bell tower" of the University of Arizona Student Union Memorial Center. The University of Arizona Student Union Memorial Center is located at 1303 E. University Blvd. The building itself is within the University of Arizona Campus Historic District which was listed in the National Register of Historic places on June 13, 1986, reference: # 86001254.
- The 1880s Tucson Depot location. It was here where Frank Stilwell, suspected in the murderer of Morgan Earp, was killed by Wyatt Earp in the company of Doc Holliday. The location is now part of the Amtrak Station which is located at 400 N. Toole Ave. and which was listed in the National Register of Historic Places on October 15, 1999, under the name of "Tucson Warehouse Historic District", ref.: #97000886.
- El Conquistador Water Tower – located at Broadway and Randolph Way. Listed in the National Register of Historic Places on June 20, 1980, ref.: #80000771.
- The Lowell Ranger Station – located at off Sabino Canyon Rd. northeast of Tucson in the Coronado National Forest. Listed in the National Register of Historic Places on June 8, 1993, ref.: #93000529.
Miscellenious items

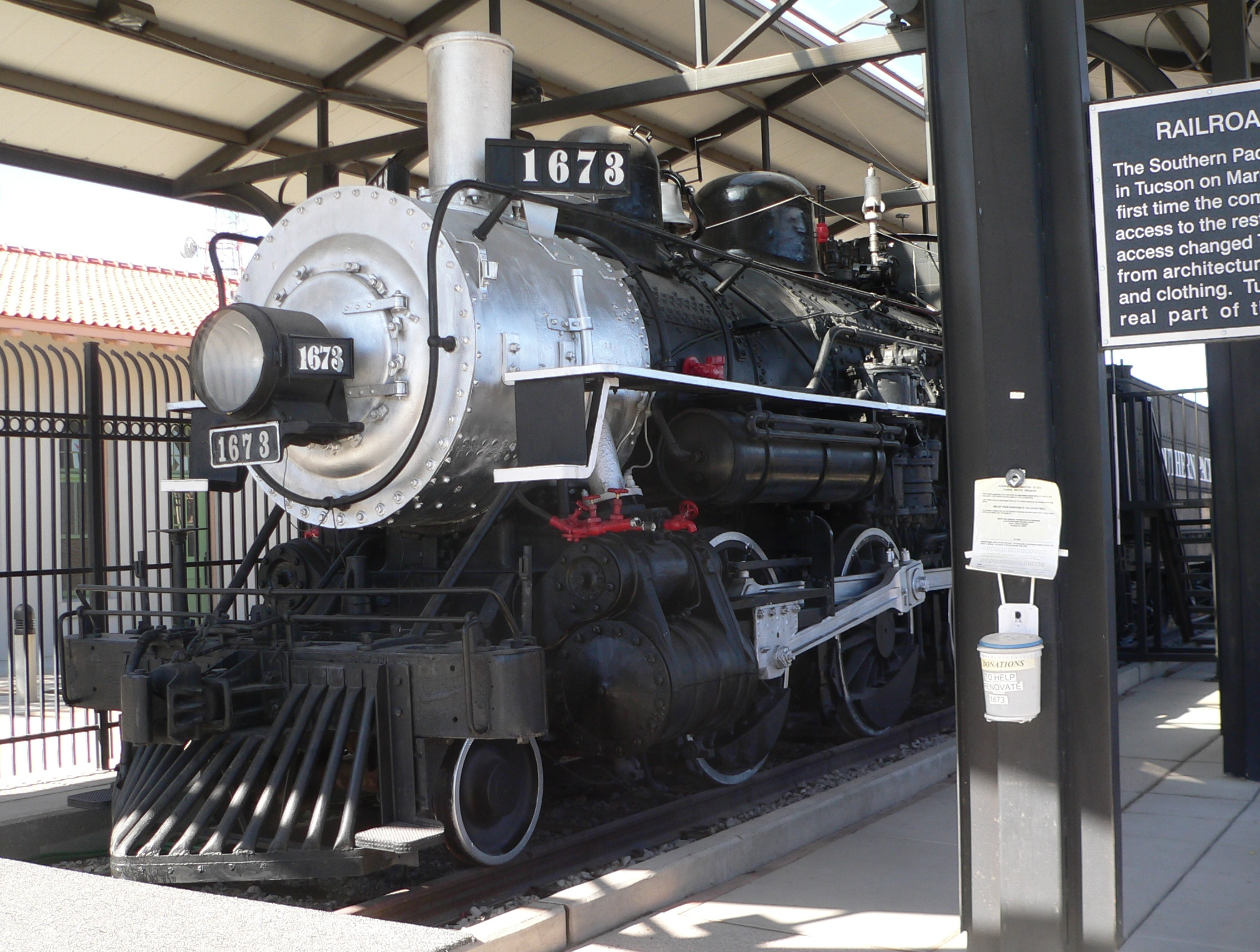
Southern Pacific Railroad Locomotive No. 1673

(NRHP = National Register of Historic Places)
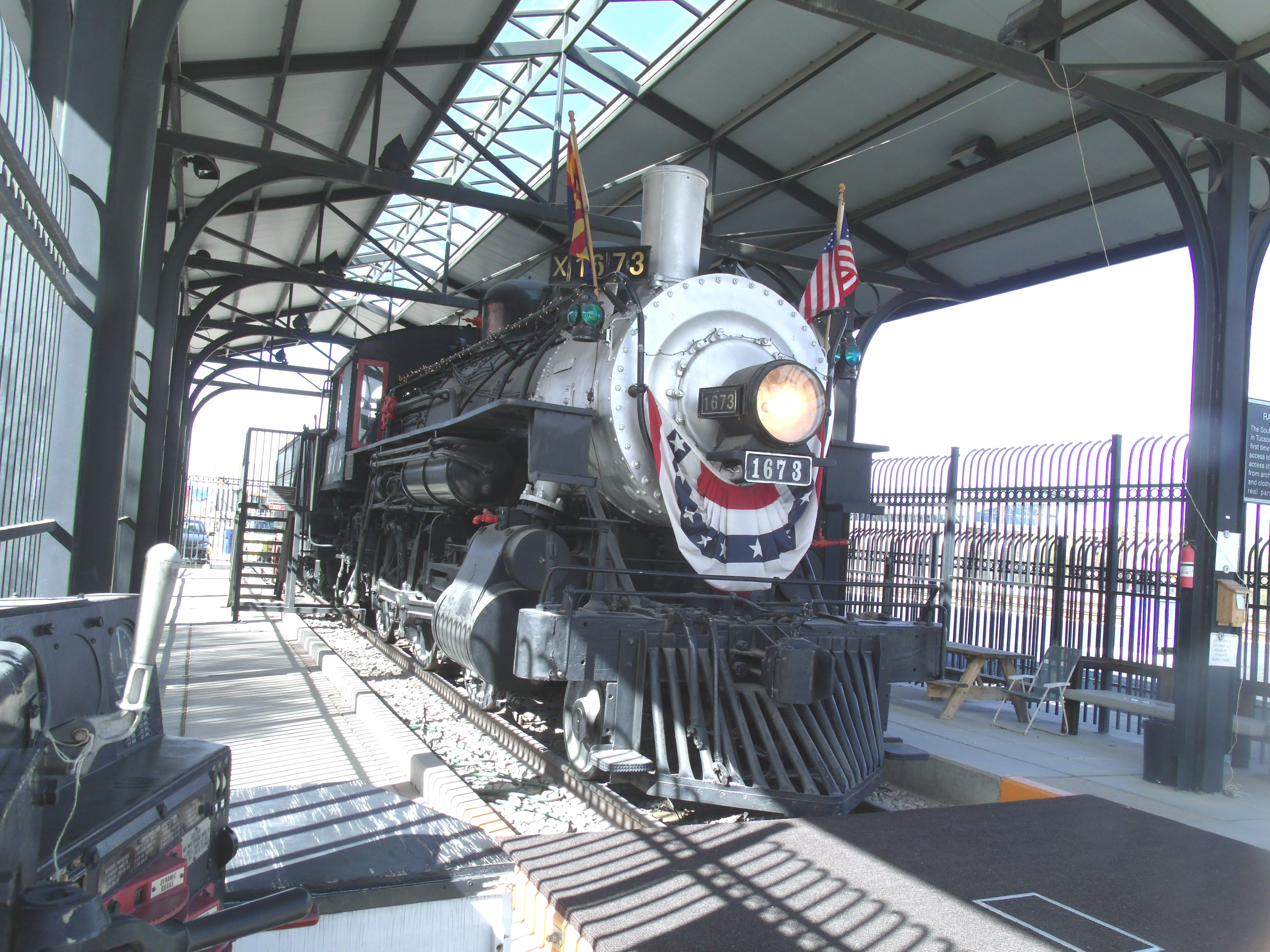
The Southern Pacific Railroad Locomotive No. 1673 .

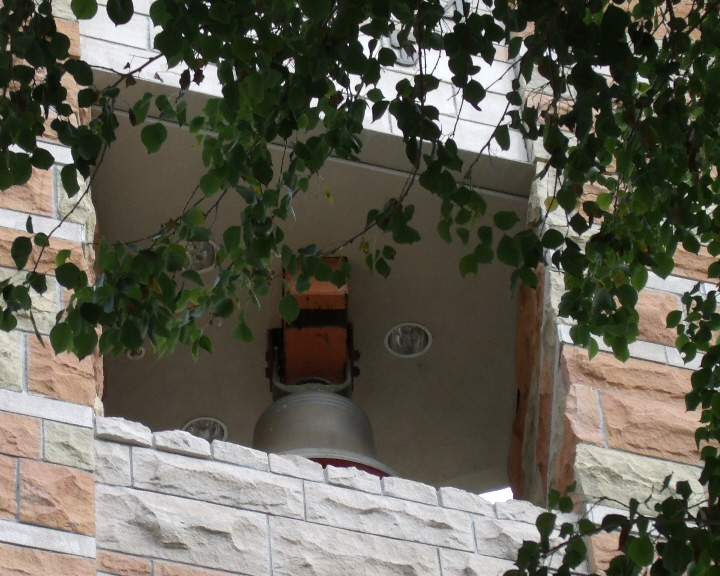
The salvaged USS Arizona Bell.

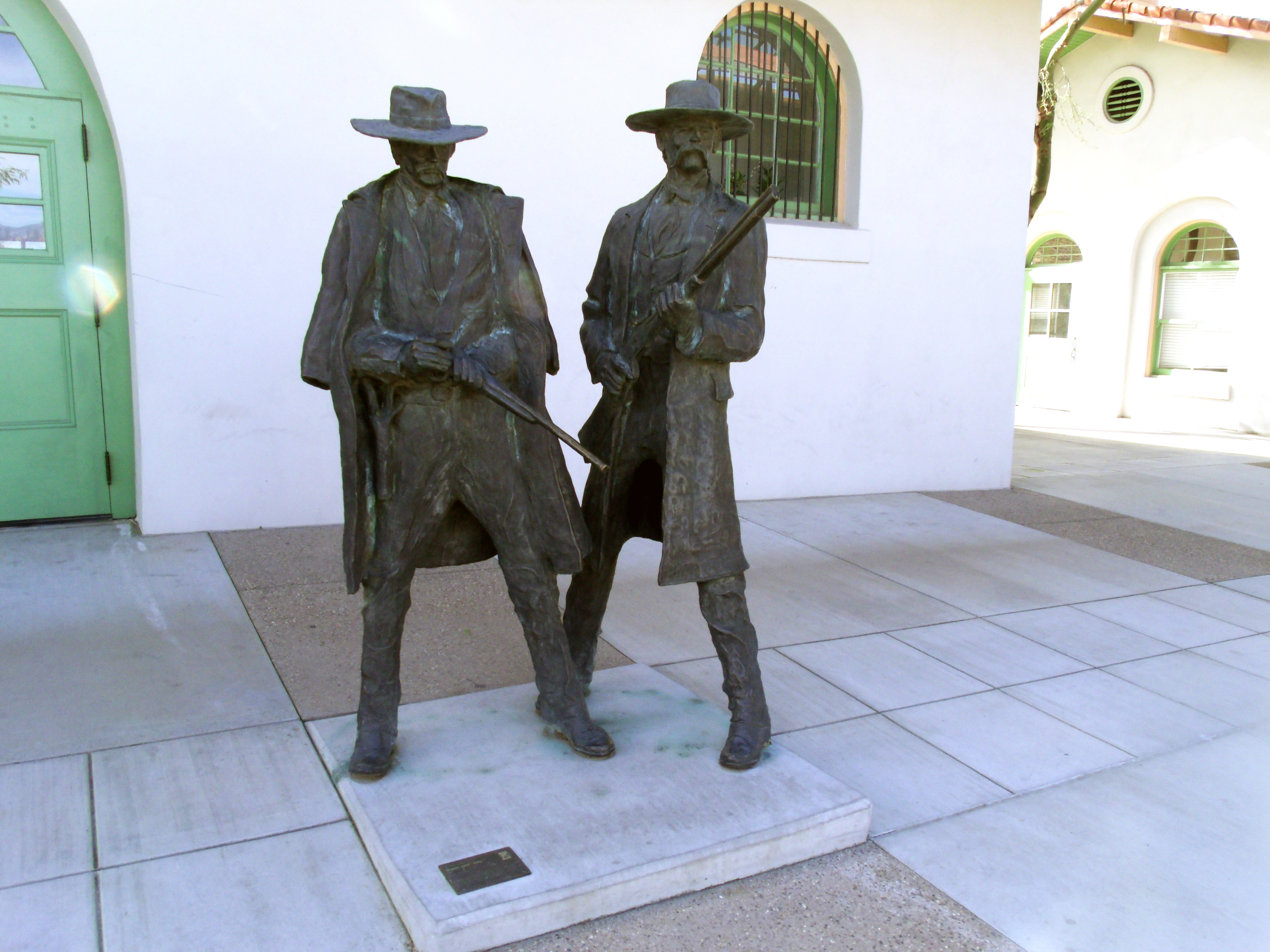
The Tucson Depot where Wyatt Earp in the company of Doc Holliday killed Frank Stilwell.

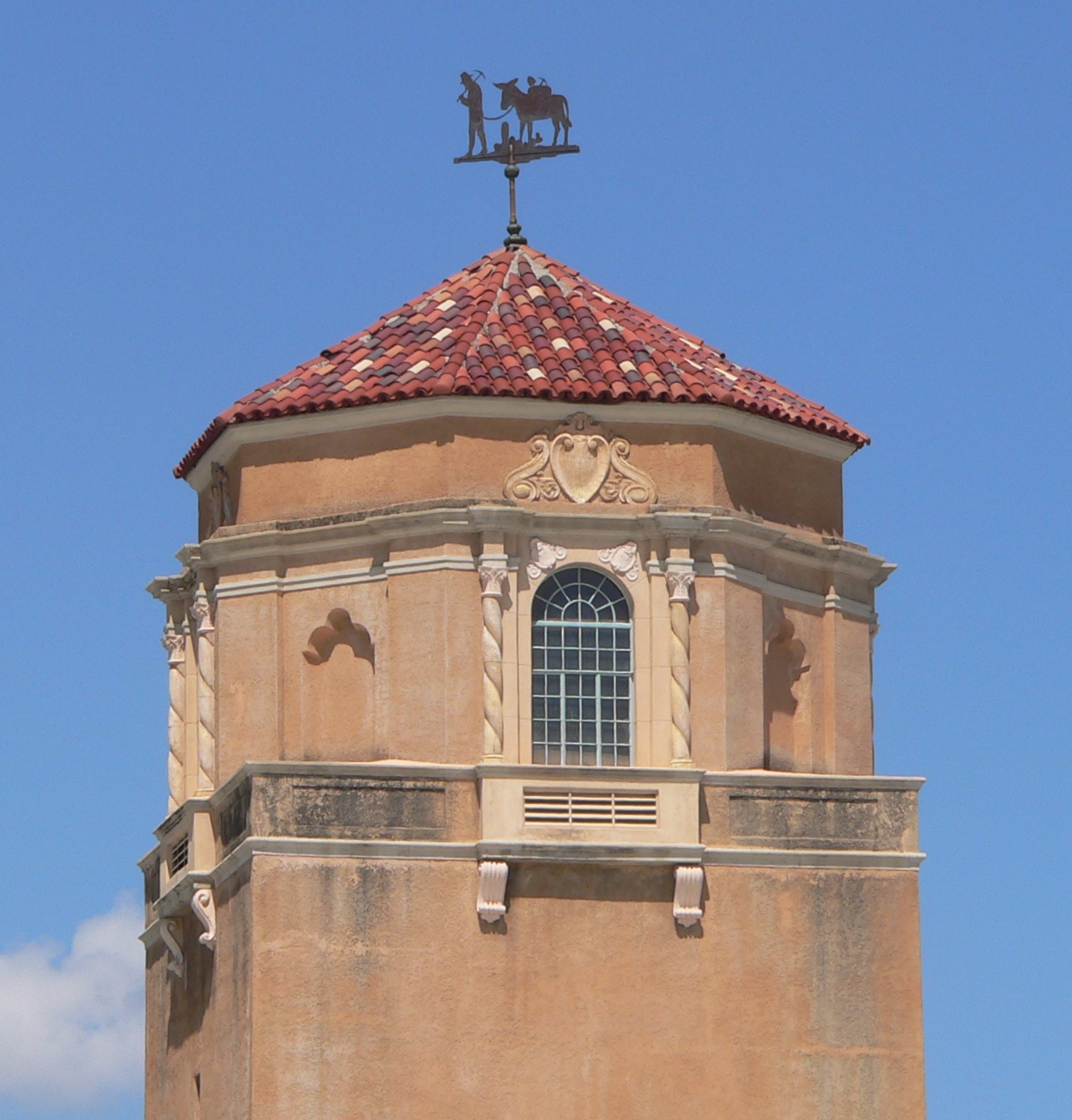
El Conquistador Water Tower.

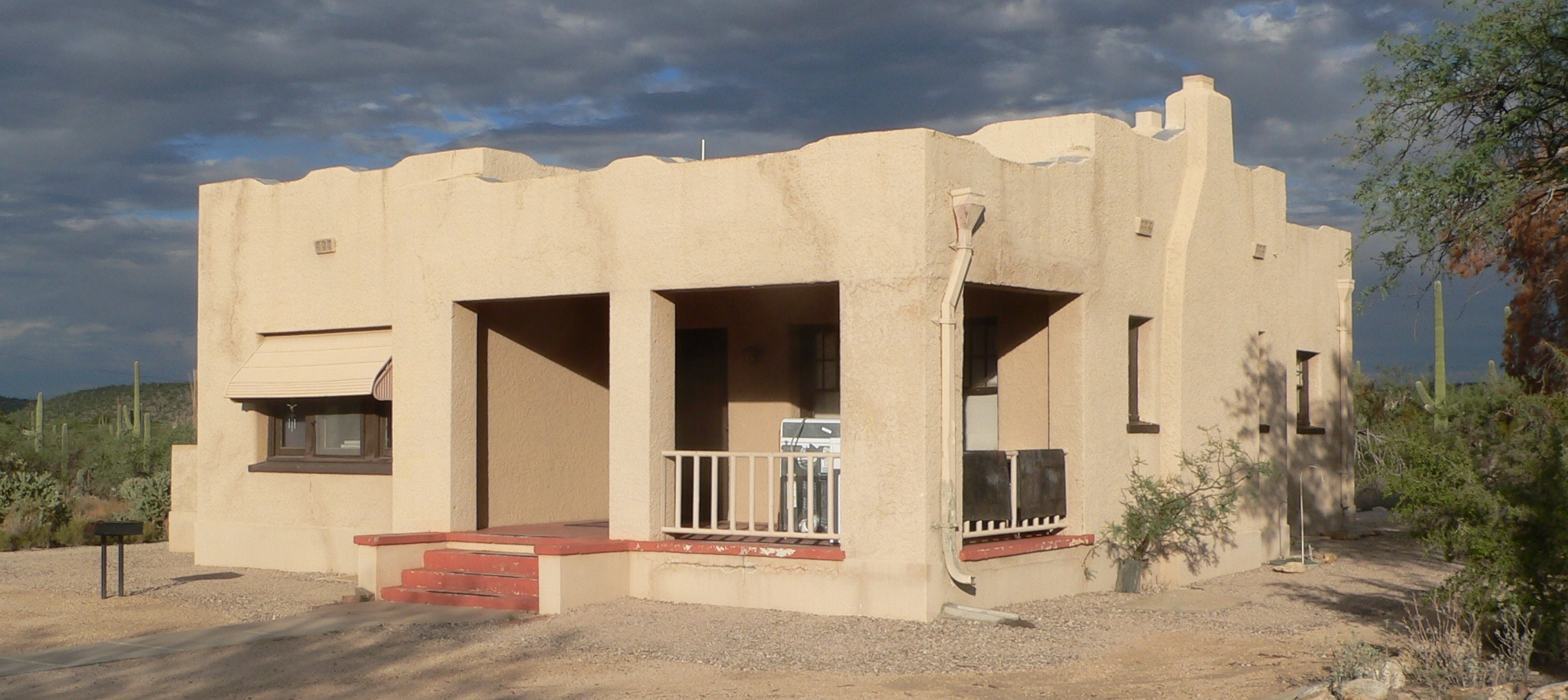
The Lowell Ranger Station.

Not pictured is:

- Valley of the Moon – a children's fantasy park built in 1920, by George Phar Legler. located at 2544 E. Allen Rd. Listed in the National Register of Historic Places on July 28, 2011, ref.: #11000480.

== See also ==
- Tucson, Arizona
- National Register of Historic Places listings in Pima County, Arizona
