= Flag of Tucson, Arizona =

Flag of Tucson
- Proportion: 3:5
- Adopted: January 5, 1953; 73 years ago
- Design: Solid white with the Tucson city seal in the center.
- Designed by: Mary Crowfoot

The flag of Tucson, the second-largest city in Arizona, consists of a solid white background with the seal of Tucson in the center. The seal consists of text surrounding it reading "City of Tucson" at the top and "Arizona" at the bottom (both in all caps), as well as a yin and yang-like design with yellow and blue/purple. The yellow part of the seal contains the skyline of Tucson in 1949; the blue/purple part contains the Mission San Xavier del Bac. The flag was designed by Mary Crowfoot for a contest for a new city seal; after creating the design in 1949, the design became the official seal and part of the official flag on January 5, 1953. The flag has a 3:5 ratio, but previous designs had other ratios, such as 4:5 and 8:13.
