= National Register of Historic Places listings in Pima County, Arizona =

Location of Pima County in Arizona

This is a list of the National Register of Historic Places listings in Pima County, Arizona.

This is intended to be a complete list of the properties and districts on the National Register of Historic Places in Pima County, Arizona, United States. The locations of National Register properties and districts for which the latitude and longitude coordinates are included below, may be seen in a map.

There are 213 properties and districts listed on the National Register in the county, including 4 that are also National Historic Landmarks. Three properties formerly listed have been removed from the National Register.

This National Park Service list is complete through NPS recent listings posted October 9, 2026.

== Current listings ==
	Name on the Register	Image	Date listed	Location	City or town	Description
1	James P. and Sarah Adams House		August 30, 2011 (#11000568)	5201 N. Camino Escuela; 32°18′05″N 110°56′08″W	Tucson	
2	Agua Caliente Ranch Rural Historic Landscape	Agua Caliente Ranch Rural Historic Landscape	July 9, 2009 (#04001246)	12325 E. Roger Rd. 32°16′54″N 110°44′00″W	Tucson	
3	Air Force Facility Missile Site 8 (571-7) Military Reservation	Air Force Facility Missile Site 8 (571-7) Military Reservation	December 3, 1992 (#92001234)	1580 W. Duval Mine Rd. 31°54′11″N 110°59′54″W	Green Valley	Titan Missile Museum
4	Ajo Townsite Historic District	Ajo Townsite Historic District	November 30, 2001 (#01000877)	Blocks 1 through 31; 32°22′20″N 112°51′48″W	Ajo	
5	Aldea Linda Residential Historic District		June 9, 2009 (#09000371)	4700-5000 blocks of E. Calle Jabali, E. 22nd St., and the 1100 block of S. Swan Rd. 32°12′32″N 110°53′15″W	Tucson	Developed ca. 1947 by future state governor Sam Goddard. Large lots, houses set back from street.
6	American Smelting and Refining Company Southwestern Department Headquarters		January 21, 2022 (#100006883)	1150 North 7th Ave. 32°14′13″N 110°58′13″W	Tucson	
7	Arthur Olaf and Helen S. Anderson House		March 13, 2017 (#12001101)	5505 N. Camino Escuela; 32°18′22″N 110°55′51″W	Tucson	
8	Arivaca Schoolhouse	Arivaca Schoolhouse	April 16, 2012 (#12000199)	17180 W. 4th St. 31°34′34″N 111°19′46″W	Arivaca	Oldest standing schoolhouse in Arizona, built by rancher Pedro Aguirre in 1879. Currently a center for community activities.
9	Arizona Daily Star Building	Arizona Daily Star Building	February 22, 2002 (#02000033)	30 N. Church Ave. 32°13′20″N 110°58′20″W	Tucson	
10	Arizona Hotel	Arizona Hotel	September 12, 2003 (#03000902)	31-47 N. 6th Ave., 135 E. 10th St. 32°13′21″N 110°58′08″W	Tucson	
11	Arizona Inn	Arizona Inn	April 5, 1988 (#88000240)	2200 E. Elm St. 32°14′31″N 110°56′19″W	Tucson	Historic hotel
12	Armory Park Historic Residential District	Armory Park Historic Residential District	July 30, 1976 (#76000378)	E. 12th St. to 19th St., Stone Ave. to 2nd Ave.; also roughly 19th, 20th, and 21st Sts. from Stone Ave. to Jacobus Ave. 32°12′56″N 110°57′58″W	Tucson	Second set of boundaries represents a boundary increase of July 5, 1996
13	Barrio Anita	Barrio Anita	September 23, 2011 (#11000682)	Roughly bounded by W. Speedway Blvd., Union Pacific Railroad, N. Granada Ave., St. Mary's Rd. & I-10; 32°13′59″N 110°58′47″W	Tucson	Originally McKinley Park subdivision, recorded 1903. Named after Annie Hughes, sister of Sam Hughes.
14	Barrio El Hoyo Historic District	Barrio El Hoyo Historic District	August 13, 2008 (#08000763)	Roughly bounded by W. Cushing St. on the north, W. 18th St. on the south, S. 11th Ave. on the east, and S. Samaniego Ave. on the west 32°12′53″N 110°58′30″W	Tucson	
15	Barrio El Membrillo Historic District	Barrio El Membrillo Historic District	August 5, 2009 (#09000583)	Bounded by W. Granada St. on the north, W. Simpson St. on the south, and the right-of-way of the former El Paso and Southwestern railroad line on the east 32°12′58″N 110°58′42″W	Tucson	
16	Barrio Libre	Barrio Libre	October 18, 1978 (#78000565)	Roughly bounded by 14th, 19th, Stone and Osborne Sts. 32°12′46″N 110°58′23″W	Tucson	
17	Barrio San Antonio		April 5, 2024 (#100009712)	Manlove Street, Arroyo Chico, Park Avenue, Aviation Highway, and Santa Rita Ave; 32°13′10″N 110°57′23″W	Tucson	
18	Barrio Santa Rosa	Barrio Santa Rosa	September 23, 2011 (#11000683)	Roughly bounded by W. 18th St., S. Russell Ave., W. 22nd St., S. 9th Ave., & S. Meyer Ave. 32°12′34″N 110°58′15″W	Tucson	
19	Bates Well Ranch	Bates Well Ranch	May 20, 1994 (#94000493)	Eastern side of Bates Well Rd. 32°10′06″N 112°57′01″W	Ajo	
20	Jean and Paul Bauder House		October 2, 2017 (#100001661)	4775 N. Camino Antonio; 32°17′43″N 110°55′38″W	Tucson	Boundary increases approved September 5, 2019 and May 22, 2020.
21	Binghampton Rural Historic Landscape		May 1, 2003 (#03000316)	Approximately at the junction of N. Dodge Boulevard and E. River Rd. 32°16′45″N 110°55′01″W	Tucson	
22	Blenman-Elm Historic District	Blenman-Elm Historic District	October 29, 2003 (#03000318)	Bounded by Grant, Country Club, Speedway, and Campbell; 32°14′38″N 110°56′00″W	Tucson	
23	Boudreaux-Robison House	Boudreaux-Robison House	March 30, 1992 (#92000253)	101 N. Bella Vista Dr. 32°13′17″N 110°59′42″W	Tucson	
24	Bray-Valenzuela House	Bray-Valenzuela House	March 30, 1992 (#92000255)	203 N. Grande Ave. 32°13′25″N 110°59′21″W	Tucson	
25	Broadmoor Historic District		February 18, 2021 (#100006151)	Residential subdivision south of Broadway Blvd. between Tucson Blvd. and Country Club Rd. 32°13′03″N 110°55′52″W	Tucson	
26	Grace and Elliot Brown House	Grace and Elliot Brown House	January 24, 2017 (#100000550)	5025 N. Camino Escuela; 32°17′52″N 110°56′13″W	Tucson	
27	Bull Pasture		September 1, 1978 (#78000380)	East of Lukeville in the Organ Pipe Cactus National Monument; 32°00′49″N 112°41′42″W	Lukeville	
28	Erskine P. Caldwell House		September 9, 2010 (#10000747)	1915 E. Camino Miraval; 32°18′28″N 110°56′29″W	Tucson	
29	Dr. William Austin Cannon House	Dr. William Austin Cannon House	October 25, 1982 (#82001663)	1189 E. Speedway; 32°14′10″N 110°57′15″W	Tucson	
30	Canoa Ranch Headquarters Historic District	Canoa Ranch Headquarters Historic District	February 16, 2016 (#04001158)	5555 S AZ 19; 31°47′25″N 111°01′21″W	Green Valley vicinity	
31	Casa Juan Paisano		July 31, 2013 (#13000545)	3300 E. Camino Juan Paisano; 32°18′47″N 110°55′14″W	Tucson	Home of developer John W. Murphey; designed by Mexican architect Juan Worner y Blas; built 1961.
32	Casitas de Castilian Historic District		January 10, 2022 (#100007293)	643 West Las Lomitas Rd. 32°18′43″N 110°58′49″W	Tucson	
33	Catalina Foothills Estates Apartments		September 8, 2015 (#15000568)	2600 E. Skyline Dr. 32°19′22″N 110°55′56″W	Tucson	
34	Catalina Foothills Estates Job 265 House		March 7, 2017 (#100000705)	5276 N. Camino Real; 32°18′08″N 110°55′50″W	Tucson	
35	Catalina Foothills Estates Job No. 399 House		December 4, 2018 (#100003145)	4950 N Calle Colmado; 32°17′54″N 110°55′58″W	Tucson	
36	Catalina Townhouses Historic District		May 26, 2020 (#100005226)	6240 North Campbell Ave. 32°19′11″N 110°55′49″W	Tucson	
37	Catalina Vista Historic District	Catalina Vista Historic District	October 29, 2003 (#03000317)	Bounded by Grant, Tucson Boulevard, Elm St., and Campbell Ave. 32°14′53″N 110°56′23″W	Tucson	
38	Catalina American Baptist Church	Catalina American Baptist Church	May 23, 2008 (#08000430)	1900 N. Country Club Rd. 32°14′43″N 110°55′36″W	Tucson	
39	Cavalry Corrals	Cavalry Corrals	December 13, 1978 (#78003359)	N. Craycroft Boulevard; 32°15′44″N 110°52′28″W	Tucson	
40	Cienega Bridge	Cienega Bridge	September 30, 1988 (#88001642)	5.3 miles (8.5 km) southeast of Vail on Marsh Station Rd. 32°01′11″N 110°38′43″W	Vail	
41	Cocoraque Butte Archaeological District	Cocoraque Butte Archaeological District	October 10, 1975 (#75000355)	Address Restricted	Tucson	
42	Colonia Solana Residential Historic District	Colonia Solana Residential Historic District	January 4, 1989 (#88002963)	Roughly bounded by Broadway Boulevard, S. Randolph Way, Camino Campestre, and S. Country Club; 32°13′03″N 110°55′18″W	Tucson	
43	Colossal Cave Preservation Park Historic District		July 10, 1992 (#92000850)	Junction of Old Spanish Trail and Colossal Cave Rd. 32°03′25″N 110°38′11″W	Vail	
44	Stephen and Persis Hart Browne Congdon House		January 16, 2018 (#100001956)	2928 N. Orlando St. 32°15′35″N 110°53′18″W	Tucson	
45	Copper Bell Bed and Breakfast	Copper Bell Bed and Breakfast	March 30, 1992 (#92000254)	25 N. Westmoreland Ave. 32°13′13″N 110°59′34″W	Tucson	
46	John P. and Helena S. Corcoran House		August 30, 2011 (#11000569)	2200 E. Calle Lustre; 32°18′18″N 110°56′28″W	Tucson	
47	Cordova House	Cordova House	May 4, 1972 (#72000198)	173-177 N. Meyer Ave. 32°13′26″N 110°58′29″W	Tucson	
48	Coronado Hotel	Coronado Hotel	November 30, 1982 (#82001622)	410 E. 9th St. 32°13′25″N 110°57′52″W	Tucson	
49	George C. Craig House		June 26, 2017 (#100001230)	5005 N. Calle La Vela; 32°17′52″N 110°56′33″W	Tucson	
50	Curley School	Curley School	January 31, 2008 (#07001464)	201 W. Esperanza Ave. 32°22′20″N 112°51′50″W	Ajo	
51	Deep Well Ranch	Deep Well Ranch	October 1, 2004 (#04001072)	13001 E. Redington Rd. 32°15′24″N 110°42′53″W	Tucson	
52	DeGrazia Gallery in the Sun Historic District	DeGrazia Gallery in the Sun Historic District	October 12, 2006 (#06000932)	6300 N. Swan Rd. 32°19′47″N 110°53′30″W	Tucson	Ettore DeGrazia's studio and home
53	Desert Laboratory	Desert Laboratory	October 15, 1966 (#66000190)	West of Tucson off W. Anklam Rd. on Tumamoc Hill; 32°12′59″N 111°00′33″W	Tucson	
54	Dodson-Esquivel House	Dodson-Esquivel House	March 30, 1992 (#92000252)	1004 W. Alameda St. 32°13′21″N 110°59′20″W	Tucson	
55	Don Martin Apartment House	Don Martin Apartment House	September 9, 2010 (#10000748)	605 E. 9th St. 32°13′27″N 110°57′44″W	Tucson	
56	Dos Lomitas Ranch	Dos Lomitas Ranch	May 6, 1994 (#94000426)	Organ Pipe Cactus National Monument; 31°51′29″N 112°44′25″W	Ajo	
57	Downtown Tucson Historic District		December 22, 2021 (#100000591)	Downtown Tucson centered around Congress Street; 32°13′19″N 110°58′09″W	Tucson	
58	Drexel House	Drexel House	June 26, 2017 (#100001231)	5535 N. Camino Real; 32°18′24″N 110°55′37″W	Tucson	
59	Paul Laurence Dunbar School	Paul Laurence Dunbar School	October 18, 2018 (#100003013)	300 W 2nd St. 32°13′57″N 110°58′38″W	Tucson	
60	El Camino Del Diablo	El Camino Del Diablo	December 1, 1978 (#78000560)	Northwest of Lukeville; 32°04′20″N 113°23′12″W	Lukeville	
61	El Conquistador Water Tower	El Conquistador Water Tower	June 20, 1980 (#80000771)	Broadway and Randolph Way; 32°13′14″N 110°55′09″W	Tucson	
62	El Dorado Lodge		December 4, 2023 (#100009580)	6400 E. El Dorado Circle; 32°14′18″N 110°51′17″W	Tucson	
63	El Encanto Apartments	El Encanto Apartments	December 30, 1994 (#94001181)	2820 E. 6th St. 32°13′39″N 110°55′47″W	Tucson	
64	El Encanto Estates Residential Historic District	El Encanto Estates Residential Historic District	January 29, 1988 (#87002284)	Roughly bounded by Country Club Rd., Broadway Boulevard, 5th St., and Jones St. 32°13′30″N 110°55′22″W	Tucson	Developed ca. 1928.
65	El Montevideo Historic District	El Montevideo Historic District	September 12, 1994 (#94001070)	3700 and 3800 blocks of streets between Broadway and 5th St.; also the 3700 and 3800 blocks of Camino Del Norte; also roughly bounded by 5th St., Broadway Boulevard, Alvernon Way, and Ridge Dr. 32°13′31″N 110°54′37″W	Tucson	Second and third sets of boundaries represent boundary increases of December 1, 2000 and December 29, 2007
66	El Paso and Southwestern Railroad Depot	El Paso and Southwestern Railroad Depot	March 12, 2004 (#03000903)	419 W. Congress St. 32°13′13″N 110°58′40″W	Tucson	The depot opened in 1912.
67	El Presidio Historic District	El Presidio Historic District	September 27, 1976 (#76000379)	Roughly bounded by W. 6th and W. Alameda Sts. and N. Stone and Granada Aves. 32°13′30″N 110°58′30″W	Tucson	
68	El Tiradito	El Tiradito	November 19, 1971 (#71000115)	221 S. Main St. 32°12′58″N 110°58′29″W	Tucson	
69	The Eleven Arches	The Eleven Arches	September 9, 2010 (#10000740)	5201 N. Hacienda Del Sol; 32°18′06″N 110°55′08″W	Tucson	
70	Empire Ranch	Empire Ranch	May 30, 1975 (#75000354)	6 miles (9.7 km) east of Greaterville; 31°47′07″N 110°38′33″W	Greaterville	Centerpiece of Las Cienegas National Conservation Area
71	Empirita Cattle Ranch Rural Historic District		January 8, 2009 (#04001247)	Between Vail and Benson, south of Interstate 10; 31°57′26″N 110°31′40″W	Benson	
72	Feldman's Historic District	Feldman's Historic District	September 21, 1989 (#89001460)	Roughly bounded by Lee St., Park Ave., Speedway Boulevard, 7th Ave., Drachman St., and 2nd Ave. Also, generally north of E. Speedway Boulevard, west of N. Park Ave., south of E. Lee St., and east of N. 7th St. 32°14′18″N 110°57′45″W	Tucson	Name changed from Speedway-Drachman Historic District. Named after Alther M. Feldman, homesteader and photographer.
73	George W. Ferguson House	George W. Ferguson House	May 21, 2018 (#100002476)	6441 N Treasure Dr; 32°19′29″N 110°58′43″W	Tucson	
74	First Hittinger Block	First Hittinger Block	September 12, 2003 (#03000904)	120 E. Congress St. 32°13′18″N 110°58′09″W	Tucson	
75	First Joesler House	First Joesler House	September 9, 2010 (#10000741)	3408 E. Fairmount St. 32°14′22″N 110°55′11″W	Tucson	
76	P.W. Fletcher House		August 30, 2011 (#11000570)	4850 N. Campbell Ave. 32°17′46″N 110°56′23″W	Tucson	
77	Fort Lowell Park	Fort Lowell Park	December 13, 1978 (#78003358)	N. Craycroft Boulevard; 32°15′37″N 110°52′29″W	Tucson	Owned by the Catalina Council of the Boy Scouts of America from 1945 to 1957.
78	Fourth Avenue Commercial Historic District		October 12, 2017 (#100001726)	4th Ave. from approx. 4th to 9th Sts. 32°13′40″N 110°57′56″W	Tucson	
79	Fourth Avenue Underpass	Fourth Avenue Underpass	September 30, 1988 (#88001654)	4th Ave. 32°13′23″N 110°57′57″W	Tucson	Rebuilt in 2009; may no longer retain historic integrity.
80	Fox Commercial Building	Fox Commercial Building	April 6, 2004 (#04000258)	27 W. Congress St. 32°13′25″N 110°58′18″W	Tucson	
81	Fox Theatre	Fox Theatre	September 12, 2003 (#03000905)	17 W. Congress St. 32°13′19″N 110°58′18″W	Tucson	
82	Gabel House	Gabel House	September 9, 2010 (#10000742)	5445 N. Camino Escuela; 32°18′19″N 110°55′55″W	Tucson	
83	Gachado Well and Line Camp	Gachado Well and Line Camp	November 2, 1978 (#78000348)	East of Lukeville in the Organ Pipe Cactus National Monument; 31°52′18″N 112°47′08″W	Lukeville	
84	Ghost Ranch Lodge	Ghost Ranch Lodge	May 30, 2012 (#12000296)	801 W. Miracle Mile Rd. 32°15′37″N 110°59′06″W	Tucson	
85	Gist Residence	Gist Residence	December 4, 2009 (#09000960)	5626 E. Burns St. 32°13′27″N 110°52′21″W	Tucson	
86	Gordon House		May 9, 2024 (#11000299)	6225 N. Camino Escalante; 32°19′09″N 110°56′11″W	Tucson vicinity	
87	John and Isabella Greenway House	John and Isabella Greenway House	February 23, 1998 (#98000052)	1 Greenway House Dr. 32°21′59″N 112°52′09″W	Ajo	
88	Growler Mine Area		November 14, 1978 (#78000350)	North of Lukeville; 32°10′10″N 112°58′05″W	Lukeville	
89	Gunsight Mountain Archeological District		June 21, 1991 (#90000996)	Address Restricted	Three Points	
90	Arthur C. and Helen Neel Hall House	Arthur C. and Helen Neel Hall House	August 30, 2011 (#11000571)	4875 N. Campbell Ave. 32°17′44″N 110°56′28″W	Tucson	
91	Lewis D.W. Hall House	Lewis D.W. Hall House	August 30, 2011 (#11000572)	3160 E. Via Celeste; 32°18′09″N 110°55′30″W	Tucson	
92	Dr. Howard Paul Harrenstein House		August 22, 2019 (#100004292)	6450 North Calle De Estevan; 32°19′27″N 110°57′27″W	Tucson	
93	Haynes Building	Haynes Building	September 9, 2010 (#10000743)	312-314 E. Sixth St. 32°13′39″N 110°58′00″W	Tucson	
94	Hecker House	Hecker House	September 9, 2010 (#10000744)	2635 N. Camino Principal; 32°15′21″N 110°51′06″W	Tucson	
95	Hotel Congress	Hotel Congress	September 12, 2003 (#03000906)	303-311 E. Congress St. 32°13′27″N 110°58′00″W	Tucson	Historic hotel;
96	Sam Hughes Neighborhood Historic District	Sam Hughes Neighborhood Historic District	September 29, 1994 (#94001164)	Roughly bounded by E. Speedway Blvd., N. Campbell Ave., E. 7th St. and N. Bentley Ave. 32°13′50″N 110°56′12″W	Tucson	See 94001164, boundary increase 00001363). Its boundaries were increased on December 1, 2000, and again February 2, 2023. Additional documentation for this historic district was approved November 29, 2013 and February 2, 2023.
97	I'itoi Mo'o-Montezuma's Head and 'Oks Daha-Old Woman Sitting		May 2, 1994 (#94000399)	Organ Pipe Cactus National Monument; 32°07′02″N 112°42′19″W	Ajo	
98	Indian House Community Residential Historic District		October 28, 2001 (#01001173)	Roughly bounded by 5th St., E. Wash, Kane Estates, and Sahura St. 32°13′41″N 110°51′52″W	Tucson	
99	Indian Ridge Historic District		July 16, 2010 (#10000467)	Northwest of Sabino Canyon and Tanque Verde; 32°15′29″N 110°50′43″W	Tucson	
100	Iron Horse Expansion Historic District		June 19, 1986 (#86001347)	Roughly bounded by 8th St., Euclid Ave., Hughes, and 10th Sts., and N. 4th and Hoff Aves. 32°13′25″N 110°57′42″W	Tucson	
101	J. C. Penney-Chicago Store	J. C. Penney-Chicago Store	September 12, 2003 (#03000907)	130 E. Congress St. 32°13′18″N 110°58′08″W	Tucson	
102	Jacobson House	Jacobson House	July 24, 2022 (#100007931)	5645 North Campbell Ave. 32°18′33″N 110°56′12″W	Tucson	Designed by Judith Chafee
103	Jefferson Park Historic District	Jefferson Park Historic District	May 1, 2012 (#12000241)	Roughly bounded by Euclid, Grant, Campbell & alley south of Lester. 32°14′48″N 110°57′08″W	Tucson	Several streets given tree names by landowner Anna Lester.
104	Joesler-Loerpabel House		December 19, 2025 (#100012380)	306 N Longfellow Avenue; 32°13′32″N 110°54′26″W	Tucson	
105	Donald S. and Elizabeth E. Johnson House		October 18, 2018 (#100003014)	5165 N Camino St. 32°18′02″N 110°56′01″W	Tucson	
106	Julian-Drew Building	Julian-Drew Building	March 29, 1996 (#96000306)	182 E. Broadway; 32°13′15″N 110°58′02″W	Tucson	
107	Kentucky Camp Historic District	Kentucky Camp Historic District	November 22, 1995 (#95001312)	Address Restricted	Sonoita	Ghost town and former mining camp
108	Lemmon Rock Lookout House	Lemmon Rock Lookout House	January 28, 1988 (#87002465)	Coronado National Forest; 32°26′06″N 110°47′22″W	Tucson	Historic fire lookout
109	Los Robles Archaeological District	Los Robles Archaeological District	May 11, 1989 (#89000337)	Address Restricted	Red Rock	
110	Lowell Ranger Station	Lowell Ranger Station	June 10, 1993 (#93000529)	Off Sabino Canyon Rd. northeast of Tucson in the Coronado National Forest; 32°18′39″N 110°49′04″W	Tucson	
111	Manning Cabin	Manning Cabin	March 31, 1975 (#75000169)	10 miles (16 km) east of Tucson in the Saguaro National Park; 32°12′27″N 110°33′09″W	Tucson	
112	Levi H. Manning House	Levi H. Manning House	July 27, 1979 (#79000421)	9 Paseo Redondo; 32°13′24″N 110°58′44″W	Tucson	
113	Marist College Historic District	Marist College Historic District	October 25, 2011 (#11000760)	72 W. Ochoa St. 32°13′11″N 110°58′19″W	Tucson	
114	Antonio Matus House and Property	Antonio Matus House and Property	July 22, 1991 (#91000900)	856 W. Calle Santa Ana; 32°14′53″N 110°59′09″W	Tucson	
115	Phillip G. McFadden House		August 30, 2011 (#11000573)	5130 Camino Real; 32°18′00″N 110°56′02″W	Tucson	
116	Men's Gymnasium, University of Arizona	Men's Gymnasium, University of Arizona	October 4, 1990 (#90001526)	E. 4th St., University of Arizona campus 32°13′51″N 110°56′58″W	Tucson	Bear Down Gym
117	Menlo Park Historic District	Menlo Park Historic District	April 23, 2010 (#10000201)	13 Subdivisions irregularly bounded around Grande Ave. and W. Congress St. intersection 32°13′12″N 110°59′18″W	Tucson	
118	Milton Mine		September 1, 1978 (#78000351)	Northwest of Lukeville; 31°58′08″N 112°53′20″W	Lukeville	
119	Miracle Mile Historic District	Miracle Mile Historic District	December 11, 2017 (#100001208)	Alignment of Miracle Mile, Oracle Rd., Drachman St. & Stone Ave; 32°15′40″N 110°58′45″W	Tucson	Historic stretch of old U.S. Route 80 and U.S. Route 89, lined with historic hotels and businesses with iconic neon signs.
120	Mission Garden	Mission Garden	June 1, 2026 (#100012831)	946 W. Mission Lane; 32°12′49″N 110°59′14″W	Tucson	Listed as "Address Restricted"; property is open to the public.
121	Officer's Quarters	Officer's Quarters	December 13, 1978 (#78003366)	N. Craycroft Boulevard; 32°15′29″N 110°52′28″W	Tucson	Includes Commanding Officer's quarters (photo, now restored) at old Fort Lowell
122	Old Adobe Patio	Old Adobe Patio	June 3, 1971 (#71000117)	40 W. Broadway; 32°13′15″N 110°58′19″W	Tucson	Also known as Charles O. Brown House
123	Old Library Building	Old Library Building	November 28, 1979 (#79000422)	University of Arizona campus 32°13′56″N 110°57′18″W	Tucson	Now Arizona State Museum, north building
124	Old Main, University of Arizona	Old Main, University of Arizona	April 13, 1972 (#72000199)	University of Arizona campus 32°13′55″N 110°57′10″W	Tucson	
125	Old Vail Post Office	Old Vail Post Office	February 22, 2011 (#11000044)	13105 E. Colossal Cave Rd. 32°02′52″N 110°42′45″W	Vail	
126	Orchard River Garden Park		February 9, 2022 (#100007418)	5701 East Glenn St. 32°15′28″N 110°52′16″W	Tucson	
127	Owen Homesite		January 9, 2013 (#12001142)	1415 E. Prince Rd. 32°16′24″N 110°56′59″W	Tucson	
128	Pascua Cultural Plaza	Pascua Cultural Plaza	September 22, 2004 (#04001032)	785 W. Sahuaro St. 32°14′56″N 110°59′05″W	Tucson	
129	Pie Allen Historic District		June 20, 1996 (#96000648)	Roughly bounded by N. Euclid Ave., E. 6th St., N. Park Ave., and E. 10th St.; also 829, 835/837, 841, 841, 843, 903, 905, 907 E. 6th St. 32°13′31″N 110°57′29″W	Tucson	Second set of addresses represent a boundary decrease February 4, 2015
130	Pima County Courthouse	Pima County Courthouse	June 23, 1978 (#78000566)	115 N. Church St. 32°13′23″N 110°58′21″W	Tucson	
131	Post Trader's Store and Riallito House	Post Trader's Store and Riallito House	December 13, 1978 (#78003367)	5425 E. Fort Lowell Rd. 32°15′38″N 110°52′37″W	Tucson	
132	Post Trader's Storehouse	Post Trader's Storehouse	December 13, 1978 (#78003368)	5354 E. Fort Lowell Rd. 32°15′40″N 110°52′41″W	Tucson	
133	Quartermaster Storehouse	Quartermaster Storehouse	December 13, 1978 (#78003369)	5479 E. Fort Lowell Rd. 32°15′44″N 110°52′33″W	Tucson	
134	Quartermaster's Corrals		December 13, 1978 (#78003370)	N. Craycroft Rd. 32°15′44″N 110°52′28″W	Tucson	
135	Ramada House	Ramada House	September 24, 2006 (#06000832)	2801 E Camino Norberto; 32°18′20″N 110°55′47″W	Tucson	Designed by Judith Chafee
136	Rebeil Block	Rebeil Block	March 12, 2004 (#03000910)	72 E. Congress; 32°13′18″N 110°58′12″W	Tucson	
137	Rialto Building	Rialto Building	September 12, 2003 (#03000908)	300-320 E. Congress St. 32°13′19″N 110°58′01″W	Tucson	
138	Rialto Theatre	Rialto Theatre	September 12, 2003 (#03000909)	318 E. Congress St. 32°13′19″N 110°57′59″W	Tucson	
139	Rillito Race Track Historic District	Rillito Race Track Historic District	June 12, 1986 (#86001322)	4502 N. 1st Ave. 32°17′23″N 110°57′24″W	Tucson	Originally listed as "Rillito Racetrack-Chute"; current name represents a boundary increase of February 6, 2012
140	Rincon Heights Historic District	Rincon Heights Historic District	January 23, 2013 (#12001190)	Roughly bounded by 6th Street, Broadway Boulevard, Campbell Avenue, and Fremont Avenue; 32°13′28″N 110°56′52″W	Tucson	
141	Rincon Mountain Foothills Archeological District		October 16, 1979 (#79000252)	Address Restricted	Tucson	
142	Robles Ranch House		September 3, 2010 (#04001157)	16130 West Ajo Highway; 32°04′43″N 111°18′36″W	Robles Junction vicinity	Ranch established 1882 by brothers Bernabe and Jesus Robles.
143	Ronstadt House	Ronstadt House	February 26, 1979 (#79000423)	607 N. 6th Ave. 32°13′46″N 110°58′08″W	Tucson	
144	Ronstadt-Sims Adobe Warehouse	Ronstadt-Sims Adobe Warehouse	May 11, 1989 (#88002133)	911 N. 13th Ave. 32°13′59″N 110°58′47″W	Tucson	part of the John Spring MRA
145	Sabedra-Huerta House	Sabedra-Huerta House	November 10, 1988 (#88002132)	1036–1038 N. 13th Ave. 32°14′07″N 110°58′45″W	Tucson	part of the John Spring MRA; no longer exists
146	St. Michael and All Angels Episcopal Church	St. Michael and All Angels Episcopal Church	April 24, 2024 (#100010265)	602 N. Wilmot Road; 32°13′44″N 110°51′27″W	Tucson	
147	St. Philip's in the Hills Episcopal Church	St. Philip's in the Hills Episcopal Church	December 17, 2004 (#04001347)	4440 N. Campbell Ave. 32°17′17″N 110°56′36″W	Tucson	
148	San Clemente Historic District		February 4, 2005 (#04001156)	Southeastern corner of the intersection of Alvernon and Broadway; 32°13′08″N 110°54′19″W	Tucson	
149	San Pedro Chapel	San Pedro Chapel	April 28, 1993 (#93000306)	5230 E. Ft. Lowell Rd. 32°15′39″N 110°52′51″W	Tucson	
150	San Rafael Estates		January 23, 2013 (#12001189)	Northeast corner of Broadway Boulevard and Wilmont Road; 32°13′23″N 110°51′20″W	Tucson	
151	San Xavier del Bac	San Xavier del Bac	October 15, 1966 (#66000191)	9 miles (14 km) south of Tucson via Mission Rd. 32°06′24″N 111°00′22″W	Tucson	
152	Santa Ana del Chiquiburitac Mission Site		September 18, 1975 (#75000357)	Address Restricted	Tucson	
153	Santa Cruz Catholic Church	Santa Cruz Catholic Church	October 7, 1994 (#94001196)	1220 S. 6th Ave. 32°12′23″N 110°58′08″W	Tucson	
154	Schwalen-Gomez House	Schwalen-Gomez House	March 30, 1992 (#92000250)	217 N. Melwood Ave. 32°13′27″N 110°59′16″W	Tucson	
155	Shrine of Santa Rita in the Desert		December 9, 2015 (#14001231)	13260 E. Colossal Cave Rd. 32°02′50″N 110°42′44″W	Vail	
156	Site No. HD 4-8A		December 13, 1978 (#78003374)	E. Fort Lowell Rd. 32°15′43″N 110°52′39″W	Tucson	
157	Site No. HD 5-26	Site No. HD 5-26	December 13, 1978 (#78003360)	5495 E. Fort Lowell Rd. 32°15′44″N 110°52′33″W	Tucson	Charles Bolsius House
158	Site Nos. HD 5-28/5-25	Site Nos. HD 5-28/5-25	December 13, 1978 (#78003364)	3031 N. Craycroft Boulevard; 32°15′47″N 110°52′32″W	Tucson	Also known as Casa Cheruy
159	Site No. HD 7-0A		December 13, 1978 (#78003361)	5429 E. Fort Lowell Rd. 32°15′44″N 110°52′33″W	Tucson	
160	Site No. HD 7-13		December 13, 1978 (#78003365)	5531 E. Fort Lowell Rd. 32°15′43″N 110°52′28″W	Tucson	
161	Site Nos. HD 9-11/9-2		December 13, 1978 (#78003362)	5651 E. Fort Lowell Rd. 32°15′48″N 110°52′21″W	Tucson	
162	Site No. HD 9-28		December 13, 1978 (#78003363)	5668 E. Fort Lowell Rd. 32°15′42″N 110°52′14″W	Tucson	
163	Site Nos. HD 12-4/12-8		December 13, 1978 (#78003375)	E. Fort Lowell Rd. 32°15′44″N 110°52′33″W	Tucson	
164	Site No. HD 13-4		December 13, 1978 (#78003376)	N. Craycroft Boulevard; 32°15′36″N 110°52′35″W	Tucson	
165	Site No. HD 13-11		December 13, 1978 (#78003373)	E. Fort Lowell Rd. 32°15′41″N 110°52′38″W	Tucson	
166	Site No. HD 13-13		December 13, 1978 (#78003372)	E. Fort Lowell Rd. 32°15′38″N 110°52′37″W	Tucson	
167	Sixth Avenue Underpass	Sixth Avenue Underpass	September 30, 1988 (#88001655)	6th Ave. 32°13′31″N 110°58′07″W	Tucson	
168	Professor George E. P. Smith House	Professor George E. P. Smith House	June 3, 1982 (#82002090)	1195 E. Speedway; 32°14′10″N 110°57′14″W	Tucson	
169	Sosa-Carrillo-Fremont House	Sosa-Carrillo-Fremont House	June 3, 1971 (#71000116)	145-153 S. Main St. 32°13′10″N 110°58′28″W	Tucson	
170	Southern Pacific Railroad Locomotive No. 1673	Southern Pacific Railroad Locomotive No. 1673	January 9, 1992 (#91001918)	Southern Arizona Transportation Museum, 414 N. Toole Ave. 32°13′26″N 110°58′02″W	Tucson	
171	John Spring Neighborhood Historic District	John Spring Neighborhood Historic District	May 11, 1989 (#88002131)	Roughly bounded by W. Speedway Boulevard, N. 9th Ave., W. 5th St., N. Main Ave., W. 2nd St., and N. 10th Ave. 32°13′55″N 110°58′27″W	Tucson	part of the John Spring MRA
172	Steam Pump Ranch	Steam Pump Ranch	September 2, 2009 (#09000668)	10901 Oracle Rd. 32°24′18″N 110°57′03″W	Oro Valley	
173	Stone Avenue Underpass	Stone Avenue Underpass	September 30, 1988 (#88001656)	Stone Ave. 32°13′38″N 110°58′18″W	Tucson	
174	Sunshine Mile Historic District		May 26, 2020 (#100005229)	Broadway Blvd. between Euclid & Country Club Rds. 32°13′17″N 110°56′39″W	Tucson	
175	Sutherland Wash Archeological District		August 15, 1988 (#88000228)	Address Restricted	Tucson	
176	Sutherland Wash Rock Art District		October 19, 1993 (#93001107)	Address Restricted	Tucson	
177	Charles S. Todd House	Charles S. Todd House	January 26, 2001 (#00001673)	11511 E. Speedway Boulevard; 32°14′12″N 110°44′45″W	Tucson	
178	Tucson Community Center Historic District	Tucson Community Center Historic District	September 8, 2015 (#15000569)	180-260 S. Church Ave. 32°13′08″N 110°58′26″W	Tucson	Now known as the Tucson Convention Center
179	Tucson Medical Center	Tucson Medical Center	June 6, 2022 (#12001143)	5301 East Grant Rd. 32°15′05″N 110°52′44″W	Tucson	
180	Tucson Mountain Park Historic District	Tucson Mountain Park Historic District	July 8, 2021 (#100005891)	west of Tucson; 32°13′04″N 111°06′10″W	Tucson vicinity	
181	Tucson Veterans Administration Hospital Historic District		August 28, 2012 (#12000548)	3601 S. 6th Ave. 32°10′52″N 110°57′56″W	Tucson	part of the United States Second Generation Veterans Hospitals MPS
182	Tucson Warehouse Historic District	Tucson Warehouse Historic District	October 15, 1999 (#97000886)	Roughly bounded by 6th St., 4th Ave., and Toole Ave. 32°13′19″N 110°58′10″W	Tucson	Historic Amtrak Station located at 400 N. Toole Ave. in the Tucson Warehouse Historic District.
183	The Tumamoc Hill Archeological District	The Tumamoc Hill Archeological District	April 5, 2010 (#10000109)	1675 W. Anklam Rd./NE corner Greasewood Rd & 22nd St. 32°12′50″N 111°00′21″W	Tucson	
184	Type A at 2101 E. Water St	Type A at 2101 E. Water St	September 9, 2010 (#10000745)	2101 E. Water St. 32°15′08″N 110°56′27″W	Tucson	
185	Type B at 2019 E. Water St	Type B at 2019 E. Water St	September 9, 2010 (#10000746)	2019 E. Water St. 32°15′09″N 110°56′30″W	Tucson	
186	U.S. Post Office and Courthouse	U.S. Post Office and Courthouse	February 10, 1983 (#83002995)	55 E. Broadway; 32°13′17″N 110°58′10″W	Tucson	
187	University Heights Elementary School	University Heights Elementary School	October 6, 1983 (#83003494)	1201 N. Park Ave. 32°14′16″N 110°57′26″W	Tucson	
188	University Indian Ruin Archeological Research District		October 17, 2012 (#12000854)	2799 N. Indian Ruins Rd. 32°15′26″N 110°50′53″W	Tucson vicinity	
189	University of Arizona Campus Agricultural Center		January 2, 2024 (#100009695)	4101 N. Campbell Avenue; 32°16′54″N 110°56′43″W	Tucson	
190	University of Arizona Campus Historic District	University of Arizona Campus Historic District	June 13, 1986 (#86001254)	Roughly bounded by E. 2nd St., N. Cherry Ave., E. 4th St., and Park Ave. 32°13′46″N 110°57′04″W	Tucson	
191	Upper Davidson Canyon Archeological District		January 3, 1992 (#91001891)	Address Restricted	Sonoita	
192	USDA Tucson Plant Materials Center	USDA Tucson Plant Materials Center	July 2, 1997 (#97000592)	3241 N. Romero Rd. 32°15′59″N 111°00′12″W	Tucson	
193	U.S. Inspection Station-Sasabe, Arizona	U.S. Inspection Station-Sasabe, Arizona	May 22, 2014 (#14000243)	AZ 286; 31°29′00″N 111°32′40″W	Sasabe	Part of the U.S. Border Inspection Stations
194	Valencia Site (BB:13:15;BB:13:74)		May 17, 1984 (#84000762)	Address Restricted	Tucson	
195	Valley National Bank Building	Valley National Bank Building	September 12, 2003 (#03000911)	27 S. Stone Ave. 32°13′18″N 110°58′15″W	Tucson	
196	Valley of the Moon		July 28, 2011 (#11000480)	2544 E. Allen Rd. 32°16′30″N 110°56′02″W	Tucson	
197	Nellie Mae Kellogg Van Schaick House	Nellie Mae Kellogg Van Schaick House	August 30, 2011 (#11000575)	4141 N. Pontatoc Rd. 32°16′56″N 110°54′12″W	Tucson	
198	Velasco House	Velasco House	March 5, 1974 (#74000460)	471-475-477 S. Stone Ave. and 522 S. Russell St. 32°12′55″N 110°58′12″W	Tucson	
199	Ventana Cave	Ventana Cave	October 15, 1966 (#66000189)	Southern end of Window Mountain	Santa Rosa	
200	Victoria Mine	Victoria Mine	September 1, 1978 (#78000349)	North of Lukeville; 31°55′46″N 112°50′11″W	Lukeville	
201	Viewpoint		February 1, 2021 (#100006082)	2840 North Sunrock Ln. 32°15′04″N 111°03′17″W	Tucson	
202	Villa Catalina	Villa Catalina	December 22, 2009 (#09001114)	3000-3034 E. 6th St. and 521-525 N. Country Club Rd. 32°13′39″N 110°55′40″W	Tucson	
203	Villa del Rio Historic District		March 30, 2026 (#100012633)	2910 North Sabino Canyon Road; 32°15′31″N 110°50′28″W	Tucson	
204	Solomon Warner House and Mill	Solomon Warner House and Mill	June 3, 1976 (#76000380)	350 S. Grand Ave. 32°12′52″N 110°59′16″W	Tucson	Mission Flouring Mill, built 1875 by Solomon Warner
205	West University Historic District	West University Historic District	December 10, 1980 (#80004240)	Roughly bounded by Speedway Boulevard, 6th St., and Park and Stone Aves.; also S side of E 5th St. between N 5th & N 7th Aves. 32°13′50″N 110°57′41″W	Tucson	Second set of addresses represent a boundary increase approved September 27, 2018.
206	Wilshire Heights Historic District		July 8, 2025 (#100011979)	East of Craycroft Road between Broadway Boulevard and 22nd Street; 32°12′55″N 110°52′23″W	Tucson	
207	Betty-Jean Wilson House		February 23, 2016 (#16000024)	2322 E. Calle Lustre; 32°18′17″N 110°56′20″W	Tucson	
208	Windsor Park Historic District		April 30, 2026 (#100012950)	Residential neighborhood north of Speedway Blvd. and east of Camino Seco; 32°14′25″N 110°48′16″W	Tucson	
209	Winterhaven Historic District		December 28, 2005 (#05001466)	Bounded by Prince, Country Club, Ft. Lowell, and Tucson Boulevard; 32°16′10″N 110°55′49″W	Tucson	
210	Woodrow House		May 24, 2018 (#100001957)	8649 E Woodland; 32°15′08″N 110°48′31″W	Tucson	
211	Herbert and Irma Woollen House		March 13, 2017 (#12001108)	4925 N. Camino Antonio; 32°17′48″N 110°55′33″W	Tucson	
212	Harold Bell Wright Estate		January 18, 1985 (#85000081)	850 N. Barbara Worth; 32°14′07″N 110°51′11″W	Tucson	
213	Harold Bell Wright Estates	Harold Bell Wright Estates	March 14, 2011 (#11000082)	Roughly bounded by N. Wilmot Rd. on the west, E. Speedway Blvd. on north, El Dorado Hills subdivision on the east 32°13′55″N 110°51′11″W	Tucson	Developed in 1950, on former estate of author Harold Bell Wright.

== Former listings ==
	Name on the Register	Image	Date listed	Date removed	Location	City or town	Description
1	Blixt-Avitia House	Blixt-Avitia House	March 30, 1992 (#92000251)	May 17, 2018	830 W. Alameda St. 32°13′22″N 110°59′06″W	Tucson	
2	Hotel Heidel	Hotel Heidel	July 15, 1982 (#82002089)	December 13, 1983	345 Toole Ave. 32°13′24″N 110°58′04″W	Tucson	Renamed "MacArthur Building"
3	Canoa Ranch Headquarters Historic District	Canoa Ranch Headquarters Historic District	May 30, 2007 (#04001158)	November 26, 2014	5555 S. State Route 19; 32°14′10″N 110°57′13″W	Green Valley	

== See also ==
- List of National Historic Landmarks in Arizona
- National Register of Historic Places listings in Arizona
