= Drew House =

Drew House may refer to:

== Buildings ==
In the United States (by state then city):

- Julian-Drew Building, Tucson, Arizona, listed on the National Register of Historic Places in Pima County
- Schindhelm-Drews House, Iowa City, Iowa, listed on the National Register of Historic Places in Johnson County
- Holland-Drew House, Lewiston, Maine, listed on the NRHP in Androscoggin County
- Elvira Drew Three-Decker, Worcester, Massachusetts, a house listed on the NRHP in Worcester County
- Charles Richard Drew House, Arlington, Virginia, listed on the NRHP in Arlington County

== Other uses ==
- A clothing line launched by Canadian singer Justin Bieber
