= Santa Cruz Catholic Church =

Historic church in Arizona, United States

- U.S. National Register of Historic Places
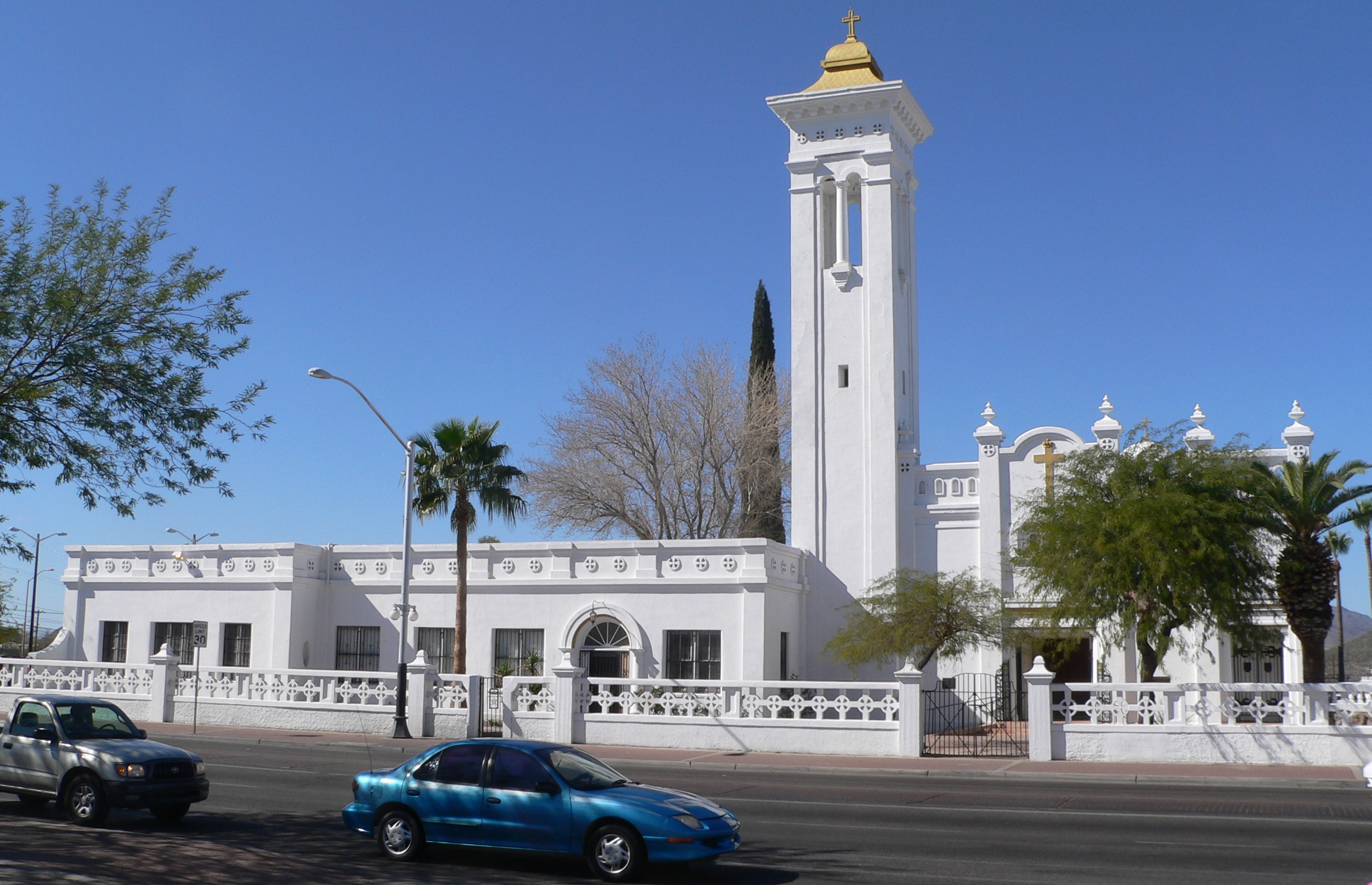
- The Santa Cruz Catholic Church in 2012.

- Location within Arizona Location within the United States
- Location: 1220 S. Sixth Avenue, Tucson, Arizona, US
- Coordinates: 32°12′23″N 110°58′6″W
- Built: 1916–1918
- Architect: Granjon, Bishop Henri; Flores, Manuel
- Architectural style: Spanish Colonial Revival
- NRHP reference No.: 94001196
- Added to NRHP: October 7, 1994

The Santa Cruz Catholic Church is a historic church near the Santa Cruz River at 1220 S. Sixth Avenue in Tucson, Arizona. It was designed by Bishop Henry Granjon of Tucson and built between 1916 and 1918. The Santa Cruz Catholic Church, or Santa Cruz for short, is significant for its construction using unstabilized mud-adobe bricks made in the Tohono O'odham Indian Reservation. It is also the largest known mud-adobe building in Arizona, and the state's only surviving example of a major public building built of adobe. Santa Cruz was added to the National Register of Historic Places in 1994.

== History ==
The Santa Cruz Catholic Church was built Manuel G. Flores in the Spanish Colonial Revival style with Islamic nuances, including a minaret-like bell tower. The overall plan is that of a long rectangular basilica adjoined by the Convento surrounding a courtyard. All of the building's masonry is covered with white paint and plaster. The roof is a frame of wooden trusses and decking with a low pitch. The rood is surrounded by a parapet with decorated perforations and piers with baroque finials. A small dome was added to the top of the altar when it was expanded in the 1940s. A continuous choir loft on the eastern side of the building above the entryway creates a sequence of compression at the entry, which opens up into a tall space above the nave. A rectangular skylight on the western side of the building lights up the altar.

Santa Cruz's bells rang for the first time at the end of World War I on November 11, 1918, when Granjon, after hearing about the surrender of Germany, ran to the church, climbed the steps of the tower, and rang the bells to announce Armistice Day to the city. The church, whose name means "Holy Cross" in English, was dedicated just a few months later in February 1919.

In November 1924, some Mexican copper miners that were striking for better wages and better hours set some dynamite off inside the church, although nobody was hurt. The strikers, many of whom were veterans of the recently concluded Mexican Revolution and Carmelite exiles, caused a significant amount of damage to some of the building's trusses, which can still be seen today. Furthermore, the blast was so powerful that it blew the front door of the church off and cracked the building's plaster walls. Although the trusses have been repaired, to this day only a limited number of people can use the choir loft at one time.

== Gallery ==
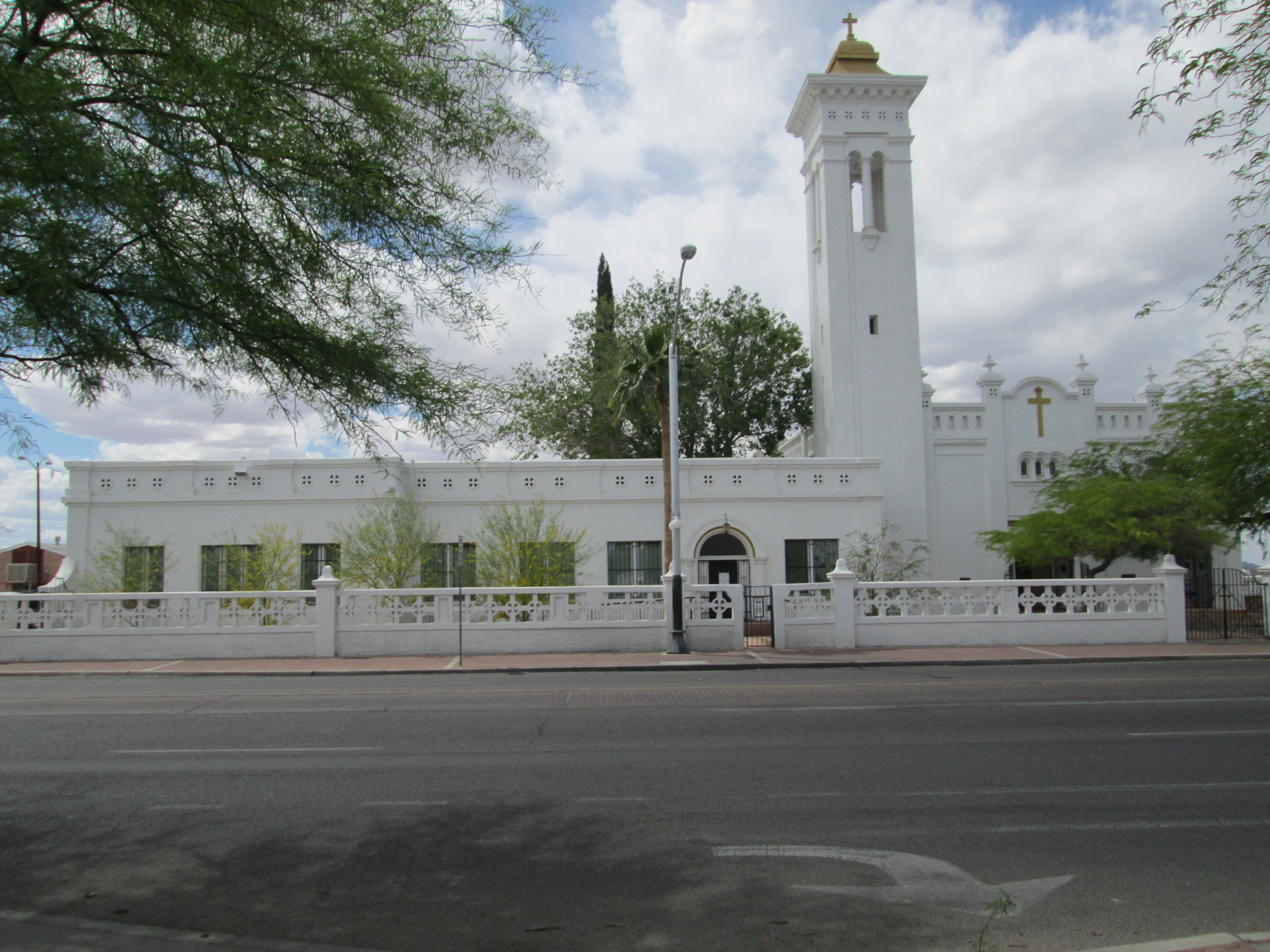
The Santa Cruz Catholic Church in 2014.

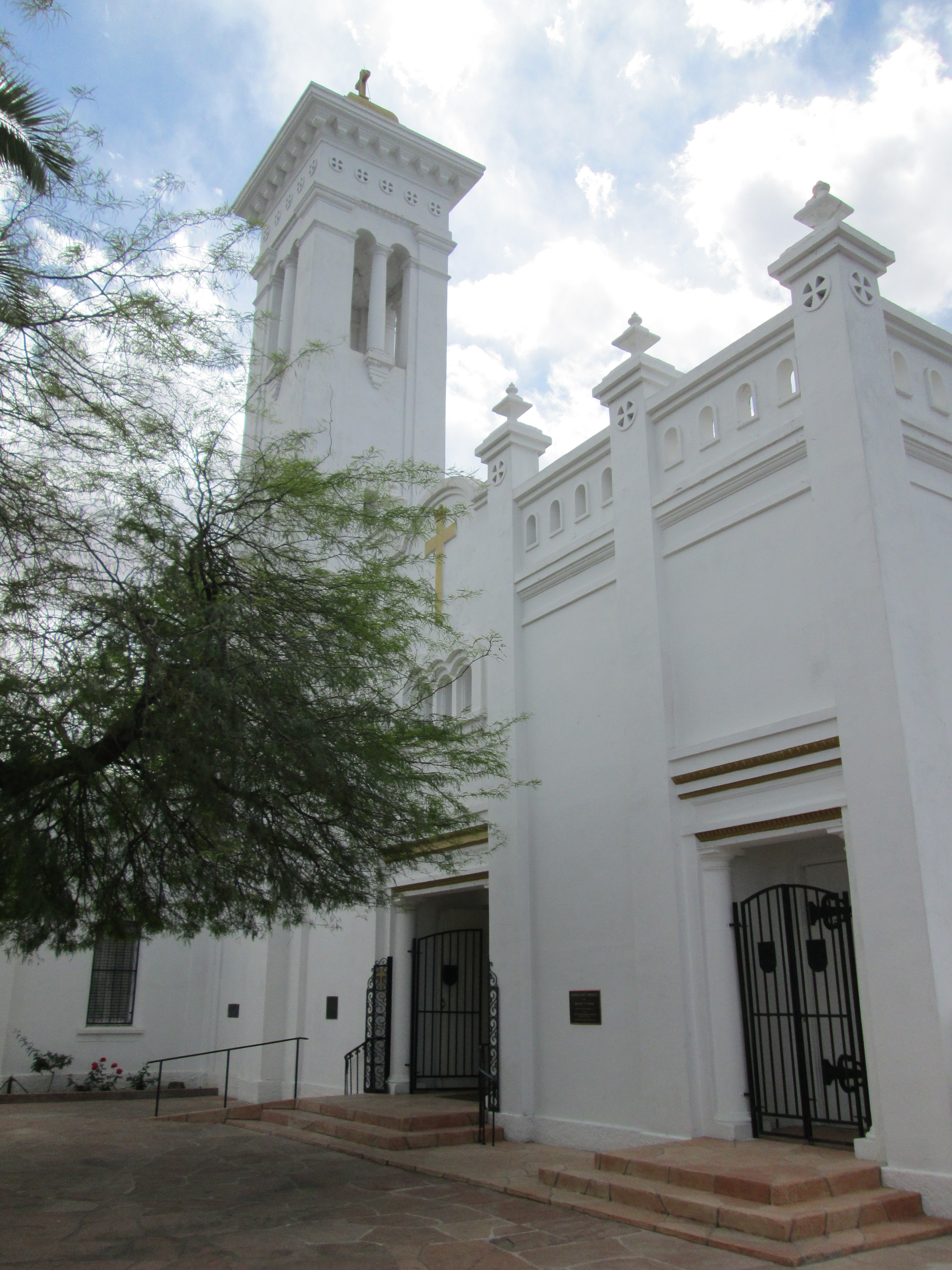
The front of the church, as seen from the courtyard.

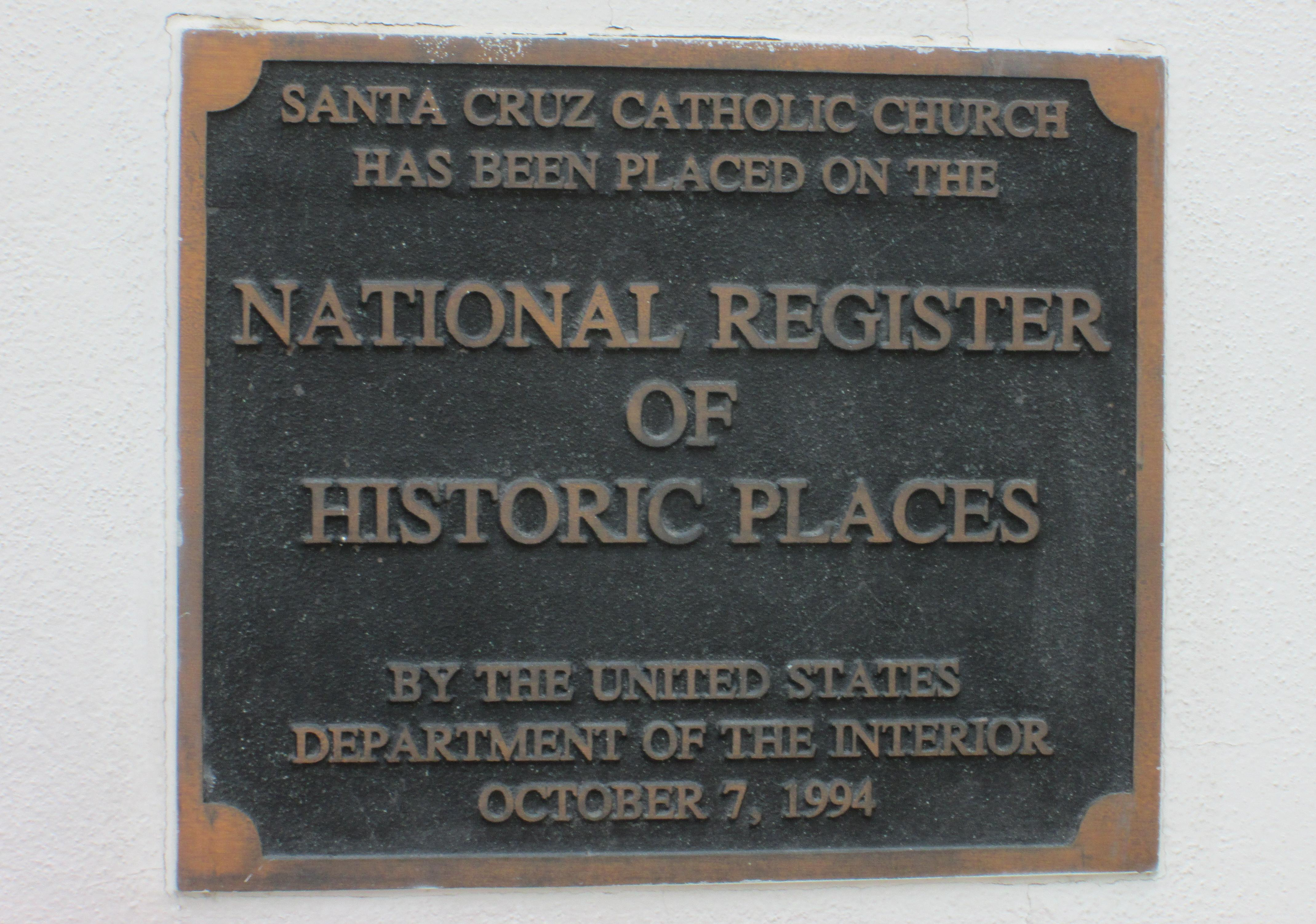
A National Register of Historic Places marker on the wall at the front of the church.

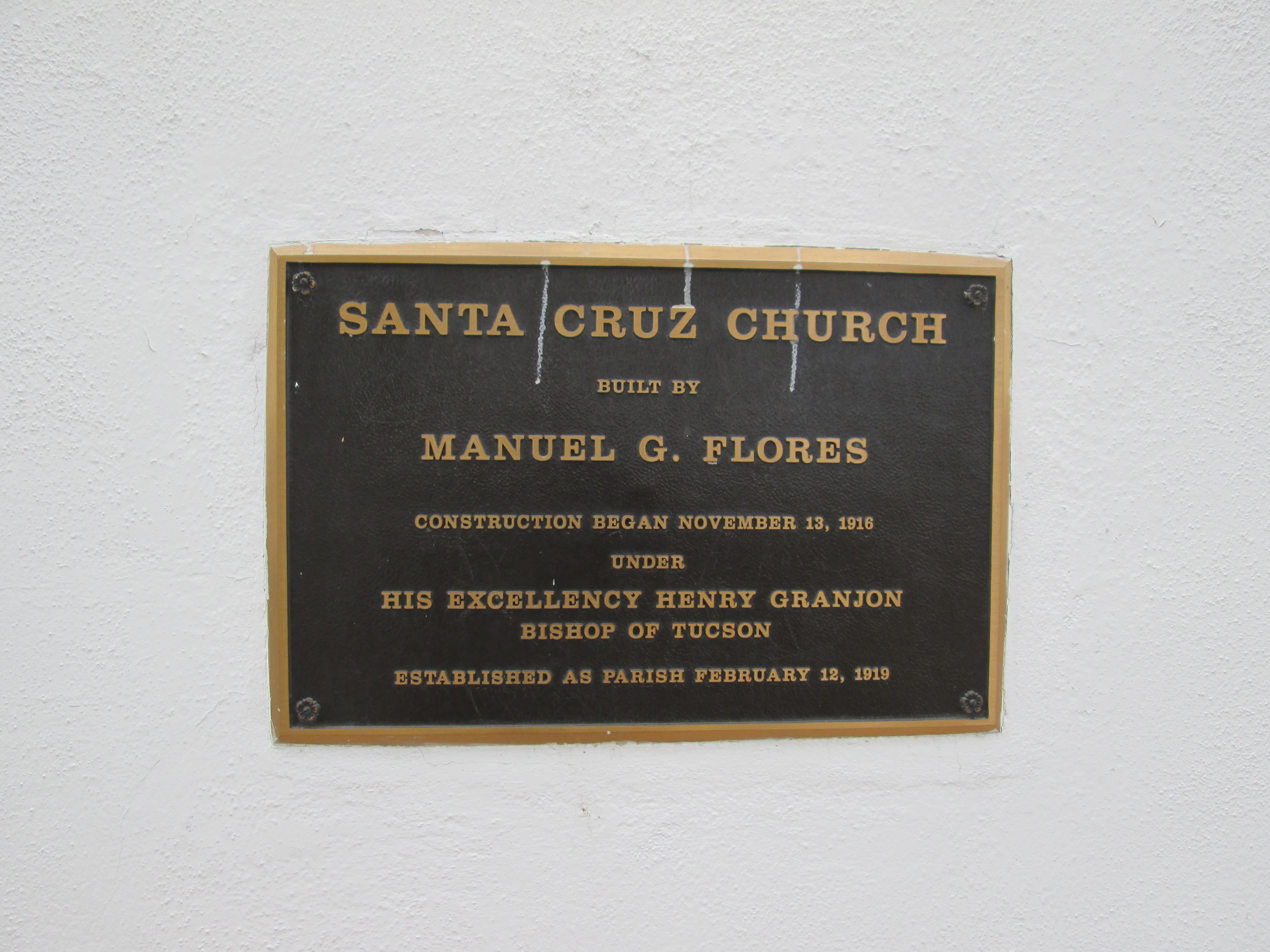
A historical marker commemorating the construction of the building.

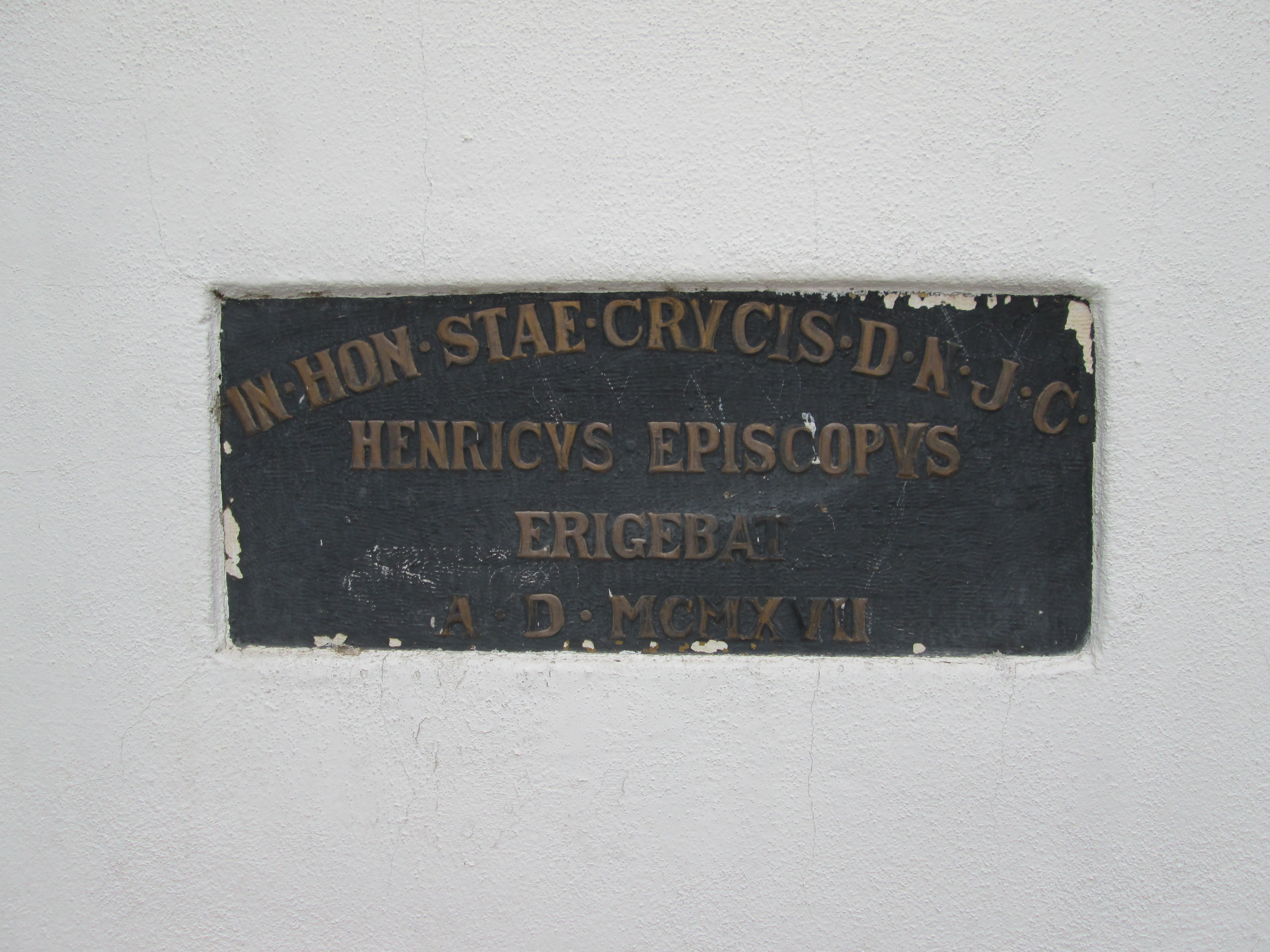
A historical marker commemorating the dedication of the church in 1919.

== See also ==
- National Register of Historic Places listings in Pima County, Arizona
