= Barrio San Antonio =

Neighborhood in Tucson, Arizona

Coordinates: 32.2140396°N 110.9484282°W

Barrio San Antonio is a historic barrio located adjacent to and east of downtown Tucson, Arizona, United States. It is bounded by Aviation Parkway, Arroyo Chico, South Kino Parkway, and South Park Avenue. The barrio is named after San Antonio, or Anthony of Padua, the Portuguese saint. The neighborhood is a federal empowerment zone and is home to multiple downtown Tucson businesses. A portion of the barrio was listed on the National Register of Historic Places in 2024.

== Development ==
The Arroyo Chico Wash along the northern boundaries of the neighborhood is being transformed by the United States Army Corps of Engineers into retention basins and public spaces. The Lost Barrio shopping district, Cox Communications Tucson, Mission Linen, and many other businesses are located in the neighborhood. The barrio is also home to the Civano Demonstration Project, and is a crossroads of bicycle paths in Tucson. The city's historic downtown center, other historic barrios, and Armory Park Historic Residential District are other well known places bordering the Barrio.

== Public Safety ==
For fire protection and emergency medical services, the neighborhood is served by Tucson Fire Department, Station 3, Radio South. For law enforcement, the neighborhood is served by Tucson Police Department, Operations Division West, Sector 8.
