= Fox Commercial Building =

- U.S. National Register of Historic Places
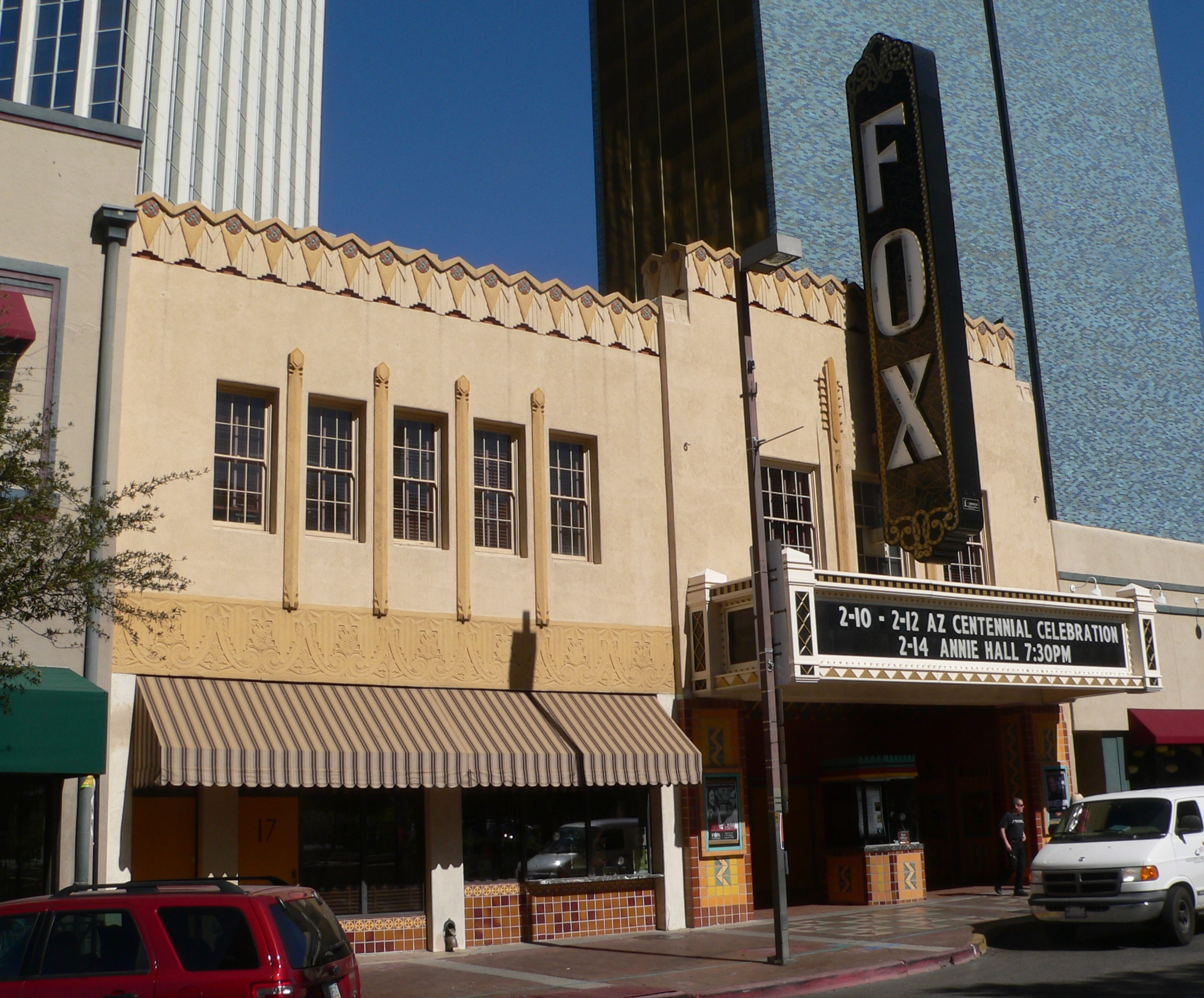
- The building in 2012

- Location within Arizona
- Location: 27 West Congress Street, Tucson, Arizona
- Coordinates: 32°13′25″N 110°58′18″W
- Area: less than one acre
- Built: 1929
- Architect: M. Eugene Durfee
- Architectural style: Art Deco, Two-part Commercial Block
- MPS: Downtown Tucson, Arizona MPS
- NRHP reference No.: 04000258
- Added to NRHP: April 6, 2004

The Fox Commercial Building is a historic building in Tucson, Arizona. It was designed by architect M. Eugene Durfee in the Art Deco style, and built in 1929. It has been listed on the National Register of Historic Places since April 6, 2004.
