= Arizona Daily Star Building =

- U.S. National Register of Historic Places
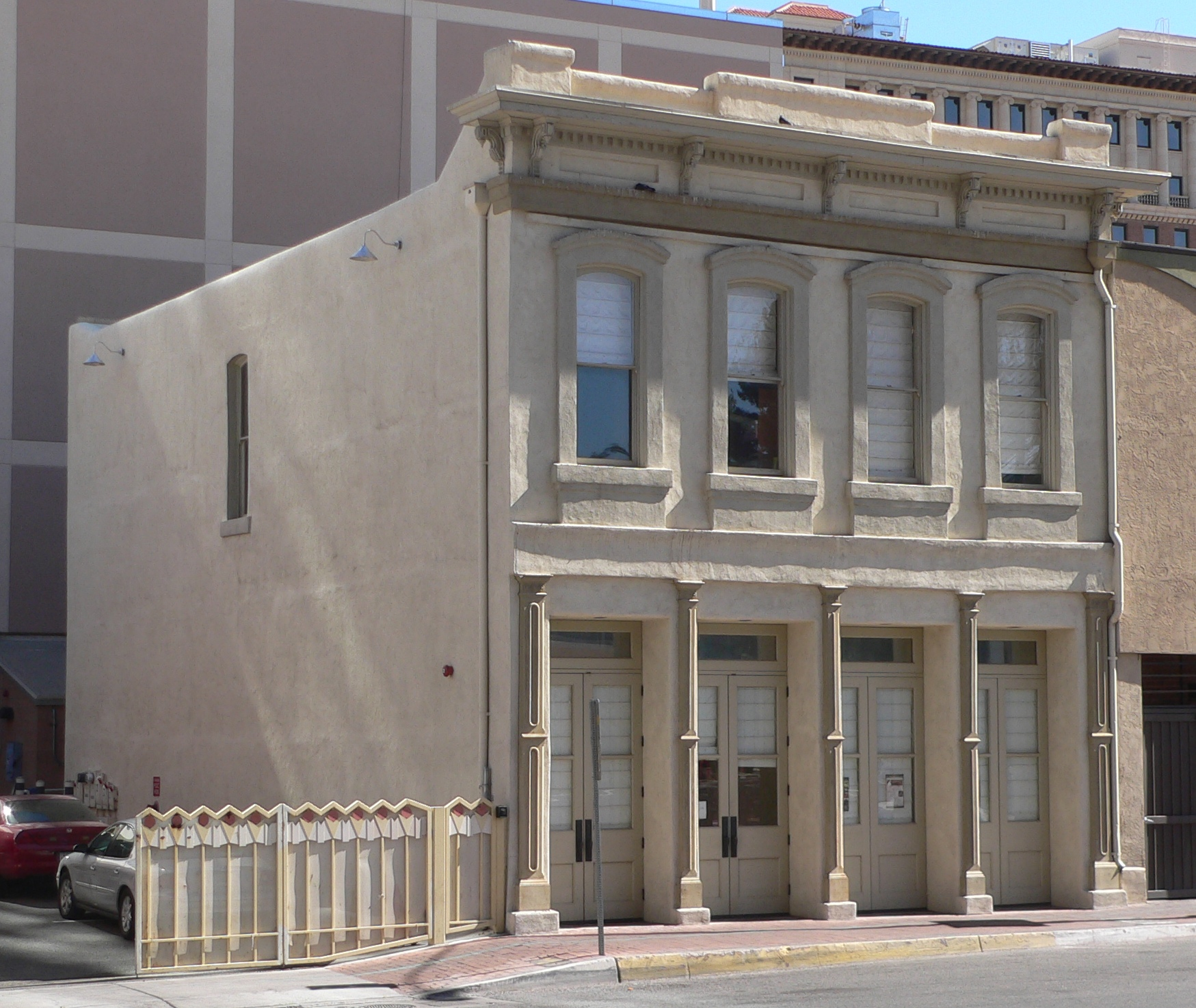
- The building in 2012

- Location within Arizona
- Location: 30 North Church Avenue, Tucson, Arizona
- Coordinates: 32°13′26″N 110°58′20″W
- Area: less than one acre
- Architect: Alexander P. Petit
- Architectural style: Italianate
- NRHP reference No.: 02000033
- Added to NRHP: February 22, 2002

The Arizona Daily Star Building is a historic two-story building in Tucson, Arizona. It was designed by Alexander P. Petit in the Italianate style, and built in 1883.

== History ==
From 1883 to 1917, it housed the offices of the Arizona Daily Star, whose editor L. C. Hughes, later served as the governor of the Arizona Territory.

The building has been listed on the National Register of Historic Places since February 22, 2002.
