= First Hittinger Block =

- U.S. National Register of Historic Places
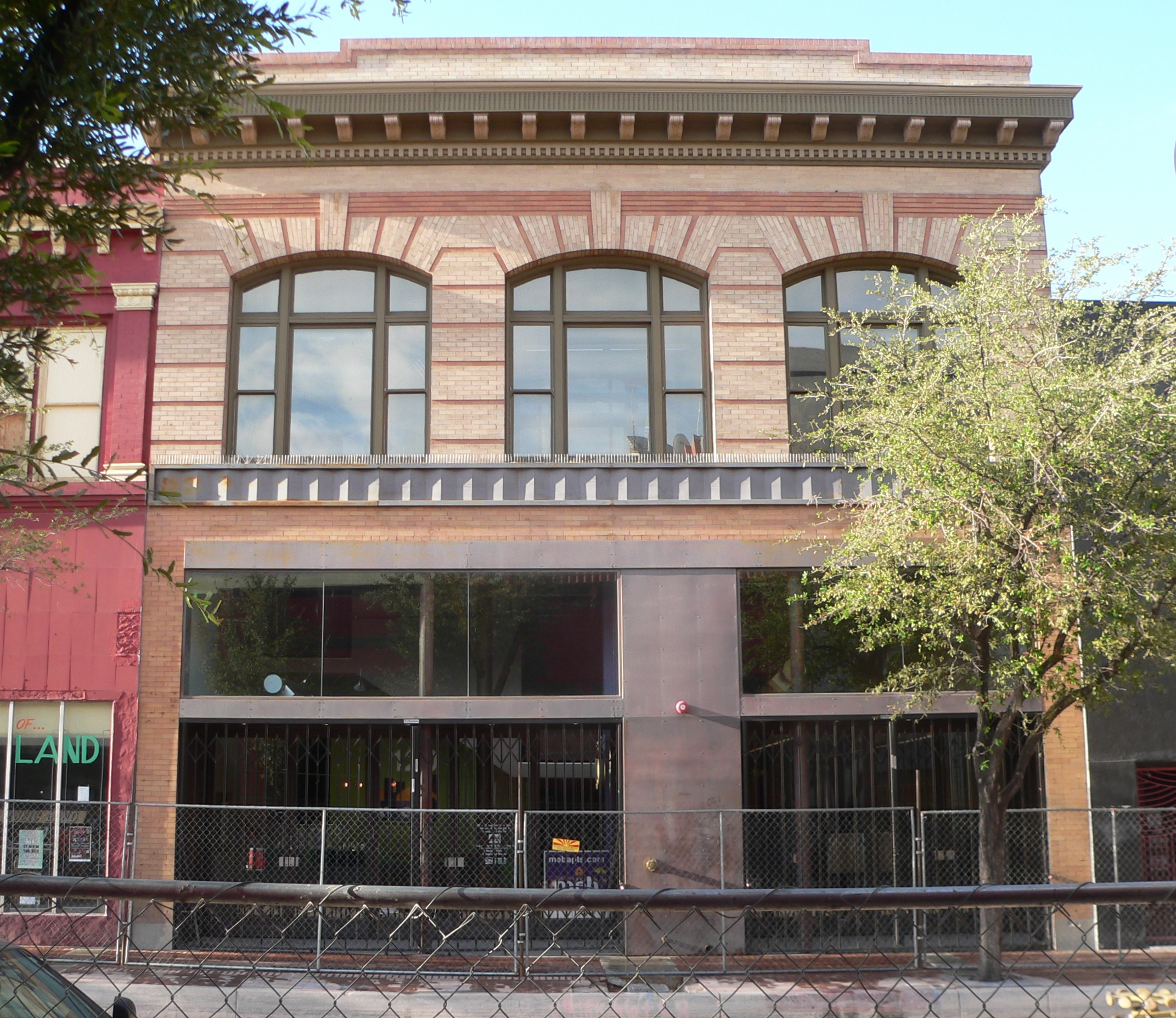
- The building in 2012

- Location within Arizona
- Location: 116 East Congress Street, Tucson, Arizona
- Coordinates: 32°13′25″N 110°58′09″W
- Area: less than one acre
- Built: 1901
- Architectural style: Italianate
- MPS: Downtown Tucson, Arizona MPS
- NRHP reference No.: 03000904
- Added to NRHP: September 12, 2003

The First Hittinger Block is a historic two-story building in Tucson, Arizona. It was designed in the Italianate style, and built in 1901. It was named for Anton Hittinger, an investor who purchased the building in 1892 and erected other buildings around it. It housed the Harry A. Drachman Shoe Company, whose eponymous founder served in the Arizona Senate from 1923 to 1924. It has been listed on the National Register of Historic Places since September 12, 2003.
