= University of Arizona Campus Historic District =

Historic district in Arizona, United States

- U.S. National Register of Historic Places
- U.S. Historic district
- Location within Arizona Location within the United States
- Location: Roughly bounded by E. Second St., N. Cherry Ave., E. Fourth St., and Park Ave., Tucson, Arizona
- Area: 45 acres (18 ha)
- Built: 1887-1937
- Architect: Roy Place, J.B. Lyman, et al.
- Architectural style: Classical Revival; Romanesque Revival
- NRHP reference No.: 86001254
- Added to NRHP: June 13, 1986

The University of Arizona Campus Historic District is a historic district listed on the National Register of Historic Places in Tucson, Arizona. It consists of the historic core of the University of Arizona and is roughly bounded by East Second Street, North Cherry Avenue, E. Fourth Street, and Park Avenue. The district was created on June 13, 1986.

== Description ==
The historic district consists of 18 contributing buildings, two of which (Old Main and the University Library) had been listed on the National Register prior to the creation of the district. The buildings are in various early 20th century revivalist styles. There are also several contributing elements that are not buildings.

All 18 buildings are constructed of red brick, with high qualities of workmanship. Red brick would remain a constant for new UA campus buildings for decades, creating a cohesive material for the campus.

Many buildings had been modified to add fire escapes and to improve accessibility; the original National Register nomination characterizes these changes as "intrusive".

=== Contributing properties ===
Year	Name	Image	Architect	Summary
1937	Gila Hall		Roy Place	A three-story brick building on North Campus Drive with marked classical influence in its composition. Renaissance details, English Bond brickwork and use of terra cotta characterize the structure. The U-shaped building has sleeping porches at the ends of the projecting wings.
1921	Maricopa Hall		Lyman & Place	A two-story Classical Revival residence hall dominated by a flat-roofed portico featuring stylized concrete Corinthian columns.
1937	Yuma Hall		Roy Place	The companion to Gila Hall, Yuma Hall shares a similar plan and massing but utilizes an Italian Romanesque Revival style instead. Variegated arched brickwork and gabled end pavilions featuring triple arch compositions characterize the building.
1918	Mines and Engineering Building		J.B. Lyman	This "imposing" three-story building is highlighted by a recessed classical portico patterned after the Parthenon; it has a full entablature that spans the facade.
1887-91	Old Main (University Hall)		James Miller Creighton	Previously listed on the National Register in 1972.
1919	Berger Memorial Fountain		Lyman & Place	see Old Main, University of Arizona
1935	Humanities Building		Roy Place	A two-story brick classroom building in Italian Romanesque Revival style with details similar to Yuma Hall. Arches have spandrels featuring "Pueblo Deco" detailing. Now the Center for English as a Second Language.
1909	Science Hall		D.H. and J.H. Holmes	A "vernacular classical" structure with the first two floors faced with brick and the third in stucco. Later housed the speech department and is now the Communication Building.
1923-27	University Library		Lyman & Place	Previously listed on the National Register in 1972. Now the North Building of the Arizona State Museum.
1904	Library and Museum Building		Russell, Mauran & Garden	Now the Douglass Building, a three-story Classical Revival building featuring two stories in brick and the top in stucco. The symmetrical façade uses excellent brickwork and double-hung window groupings.
1936	Centennial Hall (Main Auditorium)		Roy Place	This Italian Romanesque Revival auditorium uses large arched windows and entrance arches.
1935	Arizona State Museum (South Building)		Roy Place	The now-South Building of the Arizona State Museum combines Italian and Spanish Romanesque Revival elements.
1920	Cochise Hall		Lyman & Place	A symmetrical Classical Revival dormitory dominated by its elevated six-column prostyle Corinthian portico.
1913	Arizona Hall		D.H. Holmes	A Classical Revival dormitory with a prostyle portico that uses square brick piers, not columns. A U-shaped building with sleeping porches surrounding a courtyard on three sides.
1903	Herring Hall		D.H. Holmes	At the end of South Campus Drive, the university's first gymnasium, named for Col. William Herring who donated the majority of the building costs. A small Roman Revival building with a prostyle portico and arched entrance.
1915	Agriculture Building		Lyman & Bristow	The principal façade of this building is dominated by a recessed octastyle portico utilizing Ionic columns.
1937	Administration Building		Roy Place	Now the Nugent Building, a three-story Italian Romanesque Revival building with a gabled central pavilion and two two-story wings.
1936	Chemistry-Physics Building		Roy Place	A two-story red brick building in Italian Romanesque Revival style but with two main entrances utilizing classical details. A compatible addition was built in 1948 but is not a contributing property.
1921	Steward Observatory		Lyman & Place	A small octagonal building of white glazed terra cotta bricks, topped by a ribbed hemispherical dome. Several elements removed in 1958 when the new astronomy building was connected to it.
1916	Rock Wall			A wall of basalt rock quarried from local mountains, 4700 feet in length, that delineates the original campus boundaries. The main entrance incorporates wrought iron gates, a gift of the City of Prescott.

=== Non-contributing properties ===
Five properties in the district were constructed after 1938 and are not part of the historic district:

- Chemistry Building addition (1948)
- Social Sciences Building (1950)
- Economics and Business Administration (1952)
- Anthropology (addition to Arizona State Museum, 1961)
- Additions to the library (1951, 1963)
