= El Paso and Southwestern Railroad Depot =

- U.S. National Register of Historic Places
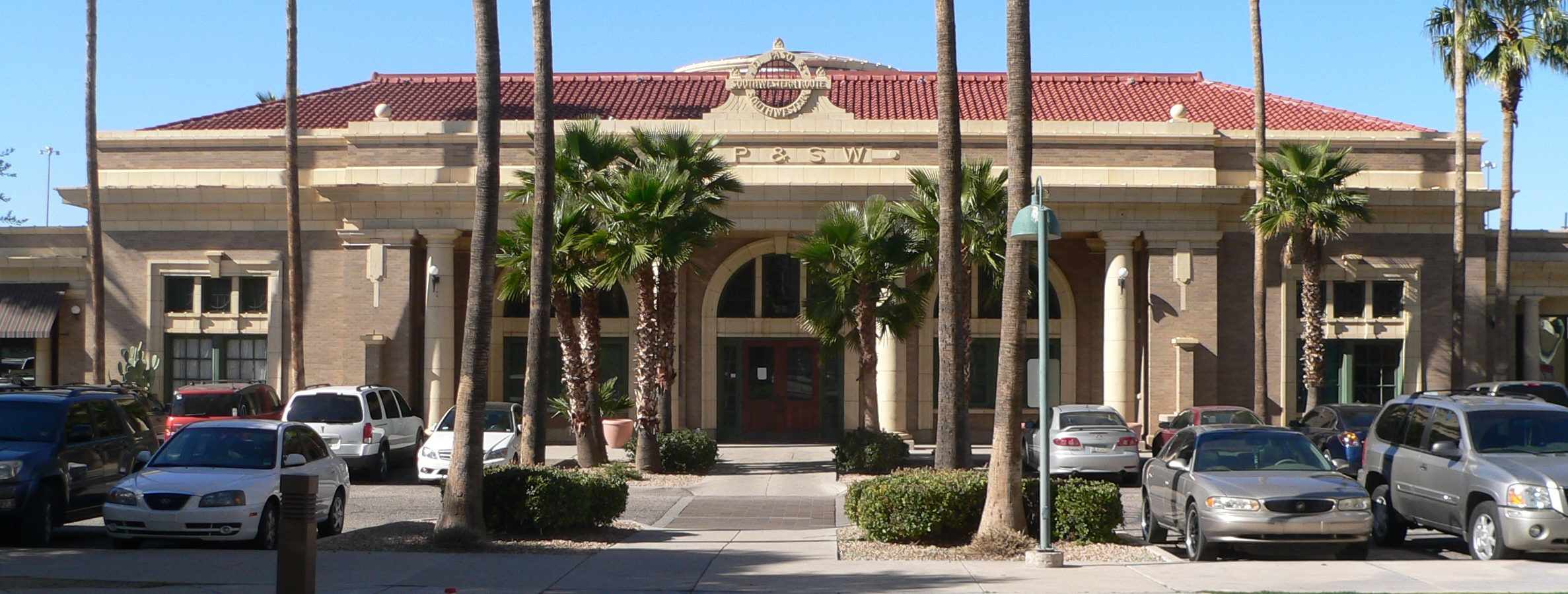
- The building in 2012

- Location within Arizona
- Location: 419 West Congress Street, Tucson, Arizona
- Coordinates: 32°13′53″N 110°58′39″W
- Area: less than one acre
- Built: 1912
- Built by: Phelps-Dodge Corporation
- Architectural style: Classical Revival
- MPS: Downtown Tucson, Arizona MPS
- NRHP reference No.: 03000903
- Added to NRHP: March 12, 2004

The El Paso and Southwestern Railroad Depot is a historic building in Tucson, Arizona. It was designed in the Classical Revival style, and built in 1912 by the Phelps-Dodge Corporation. It was used as a railroad depot until 1924. In 1978, it was remodelled as a restaurant. It has been listed on the National Register of Historic Places since March 12, 2004.
