= Schindhelm-Drews House =

Historic house in Iowa, United States

- U.S. National Register of Historic Places
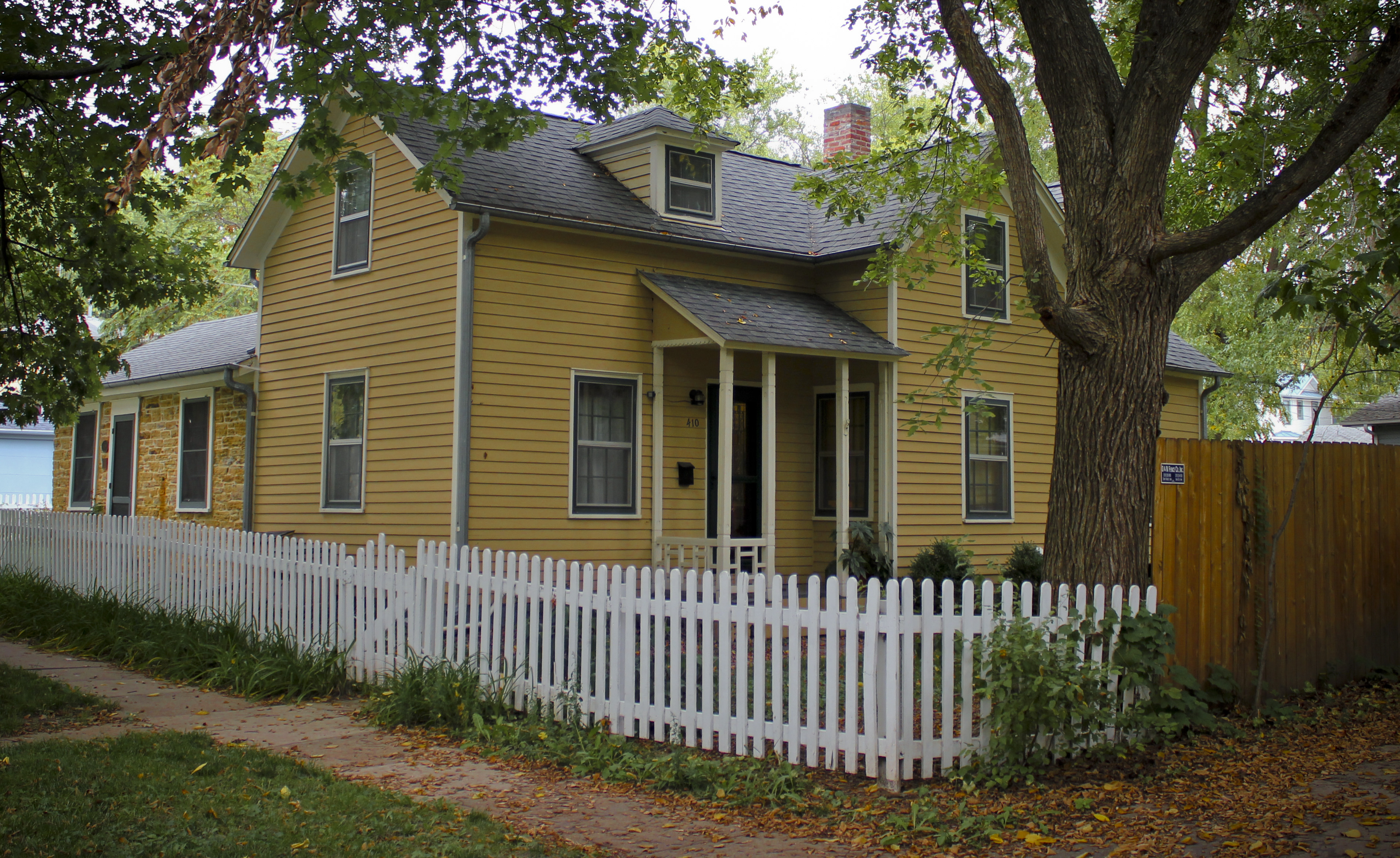

- Location within Iowa Location within the United States
- Location: 410 N. Lucas St., Iowa City, Iowa
- Coordinates: 41°39′57.9″N 91°31′26.5″W
- Area: less than one acre
- Built: 1855
- NRHP reference No.: 93001589
- Added to NRHP: January 28, 1994

The Schindhelm-Drews House is a historic building located in Iowa City, Iowa, United States. It is a well preserved example of residential architecture from the 19th century in the Goosetown neighborhood. The original section of the house was built of stone in 1855 by Christian Schindhelm. It was expanded to its present size with frame additions during the ownership of August and Henriette Drews sometime between 1867 and 1899. The 1½-story structure is a combination of vernacular forms and simplified decorative features The house was listed on the National Register of Historic Places in 1994.
