= Manning Cabin =

United States historic place in Pima County, Arizona

- U.S. National Register of Historic Places
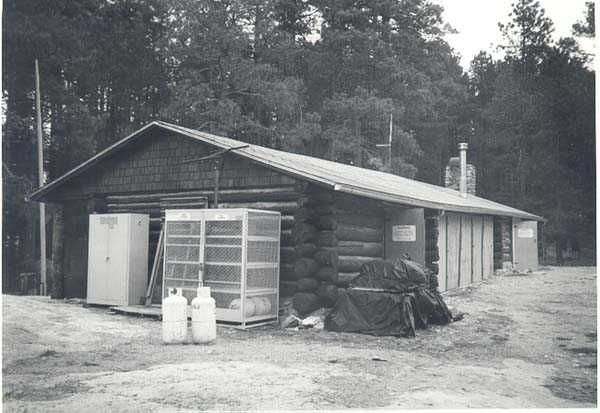

- Location within Arizona Location within the United States
- Nearest city: Tucson, Arizona
- Coordinates: 32°12′27″N 110°33′9″W
- Built: 1905
- Architect: L. H. Manning
- NRHP reference No.: 75000169
- Added to NRHP: March 31, 1975

The Manning Cabin was the first vacation cabin built in what is now Saguaro National Park. The log structure was built by Levi H. Manning, Surveyor General of the Arizona Territory and later mayor of Tucson, in 1905. From 1922 to 1939 it was used by the U.S. Forest Service to house fire and trail crews, and for the same purpose by the National Park Service from the park's establishment in 1940.
