= Julian-Drew Building =

United States historic place in Tucson, Arizona

- Julian--Drew Building
- U.S. National Register of Historic Places
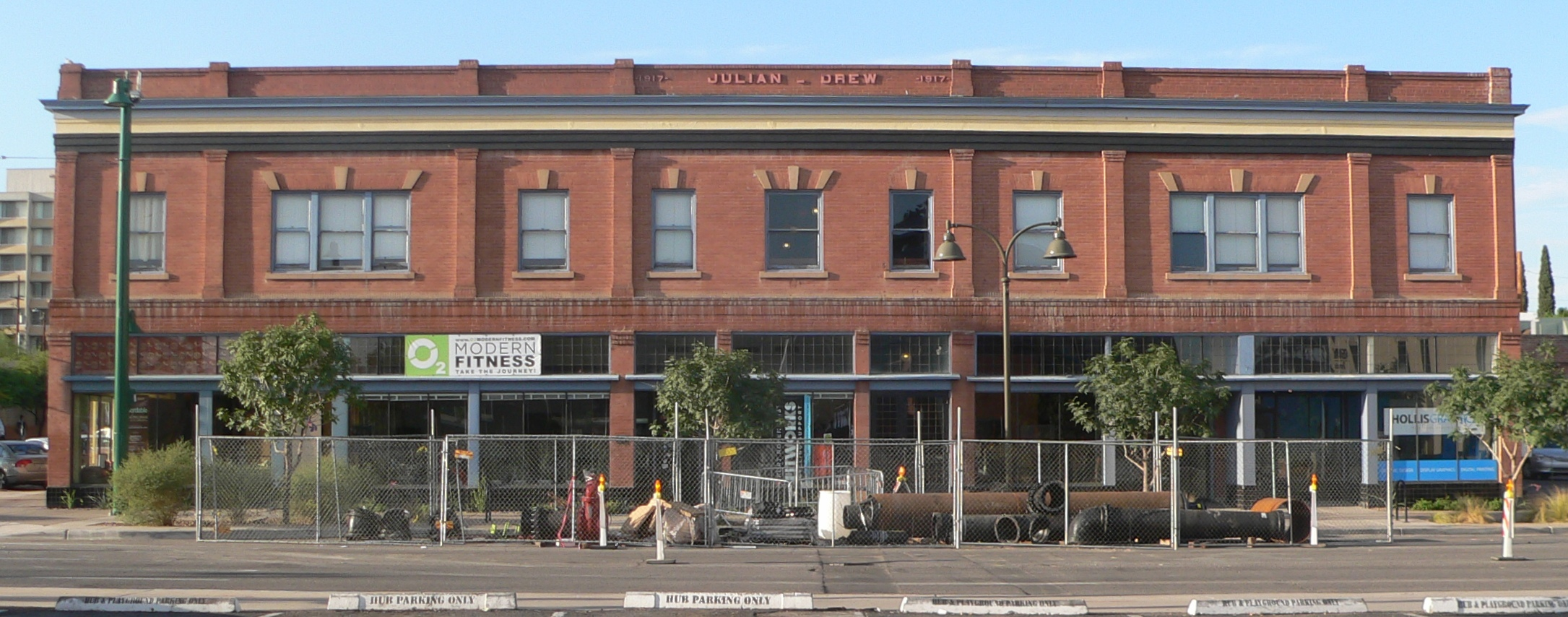
- The building in 2012

- Location within Arizona
- Location: 182 E. Broadway, Tucson, Arizona
- Coordinates: 32°13′15″N 110°57′57″W
- Area: less than one acre
- Built: 1937
- Built by: A.C. Rosewell
- Architectural style: 20th Century Commercial
- NRHP reference No.: 96000306
- Added to NRHP: March 29, 1996

The Julian-Drew Building is a historic building in Tucson, Arizona. It was built in 1937 by A.C. Roswell for businessmen William Armine Julian and W. E. Drew. Tenants included a car dealership called the Tucson Overland Company and a hotel called the Lewis Hotel. The building has been listed on the National Register of Historic Places since March 29, 1996.
