= Barrio El Membrillo Historic District =

Historic district in Arizona, United States

- U.S. National Register of Historic Places
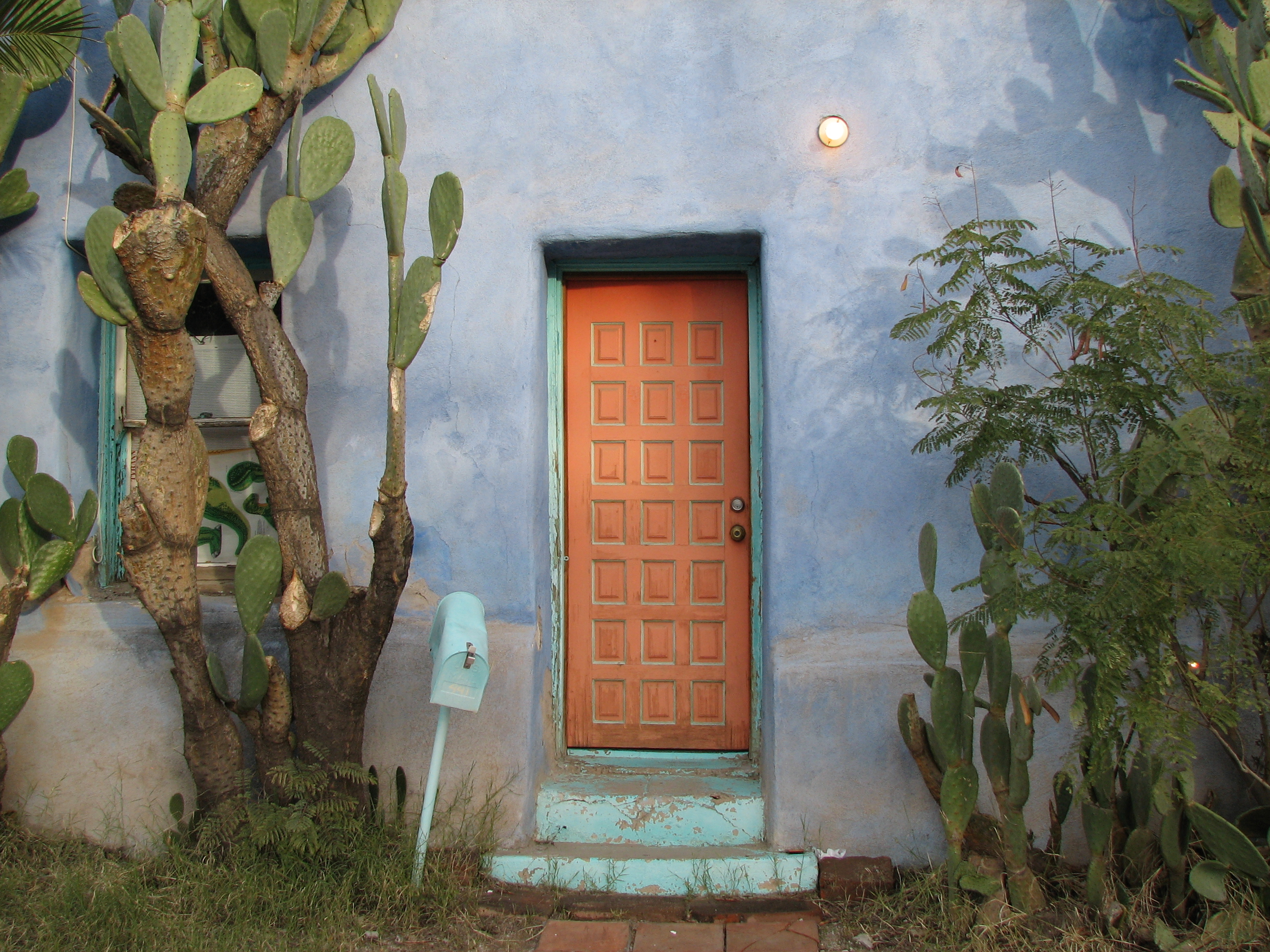

- Location within Arizona
- Location: Bounded by W. Granada St. on the north, W. Simpson St. on the south, the right-of-way of the former EP&SW Railroad on the east, Tucson, Arizona
- Coordinates: 32°13′04″N 110°58′42″W
- Area: 4 acres (1.6 ha)
- Architectural style: Sonoran Tradition
- NRHP reference No.: 09000583
- Added to NRHP: August 5, 2009

The Barrio El Membrillo Historic District in Tucson, Arizona was listed on the National Register of Historic Places in 2009. The district reflects "Sonoran Tradition", and includes 11 contributing buildings and two non-contributing ones on 4 acres (1.6 ha). It is bounded by W. Granada St. on the north, W. Simpson St. on the south, and the right-of-way of the former El Paso & Southwestern (EP&SW) railroad on the east.

It is a portion of the area of the 1920-platted "Cottonwood Addition to the original Tucson townsite. Much of the neighborhood was destroyed by the construction of Interstate 10 and the development of the Tucson Convention Center, but a significant portion remains and it is still considered a distinct barrio. As a result, El Membrillo retains integrity of location. The surviving portion of the barrio still possesses its distinctive architecture, streetscape, and housescapes."
