= MacArthur Building, Tucson =

Historic building in Arizona

Coordinates: 32.2233308°N 110.9677382°W

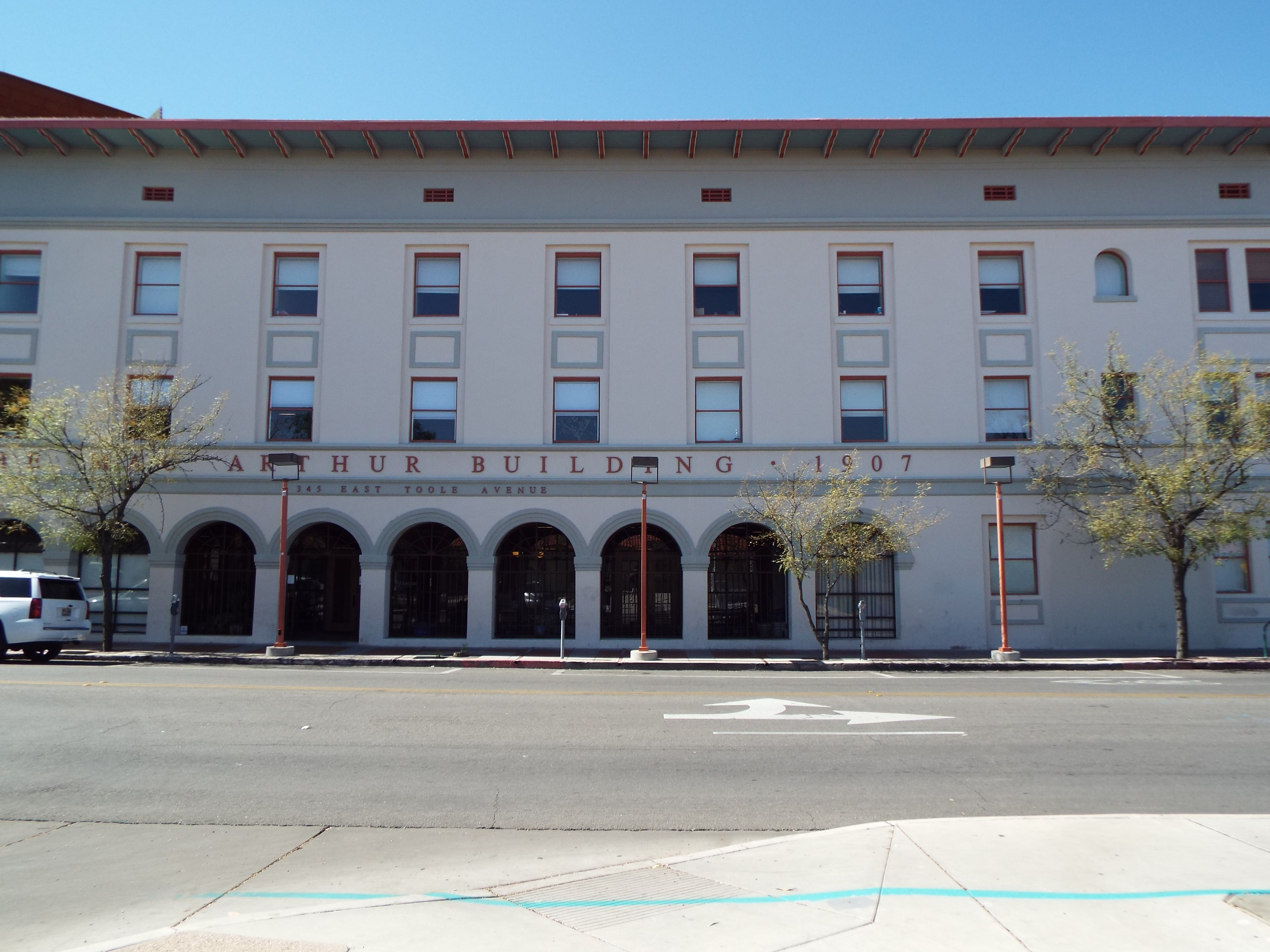
MacArthur Building

MacArthur Building, Tucson is a three-story, 22,661 sq ft (2,105.3 m^{2}) building in downtown Tucson, Arizona. It was originally named the Hotel Heidel in 1907 and was remodeled into the MacArthur Hotel in 1944. The hotel included a restaurant, saloon and barbershop and was built to serve passengers arriving via the Southern Pacific Railroad Depot. The hotel closed in 1979 and was renovated for office use in 1985.

The city bought the MacArthur Building for $2.9 million in 2005 for possible use in the Depot Plaza housing project immediately to the south, but the property was not incorporated. In 2008, the city sold the building to Madden Media.
