= Catalina American Baptist Church =

Historic church in Arizona, United States

- U.S. National Register of Historic Places
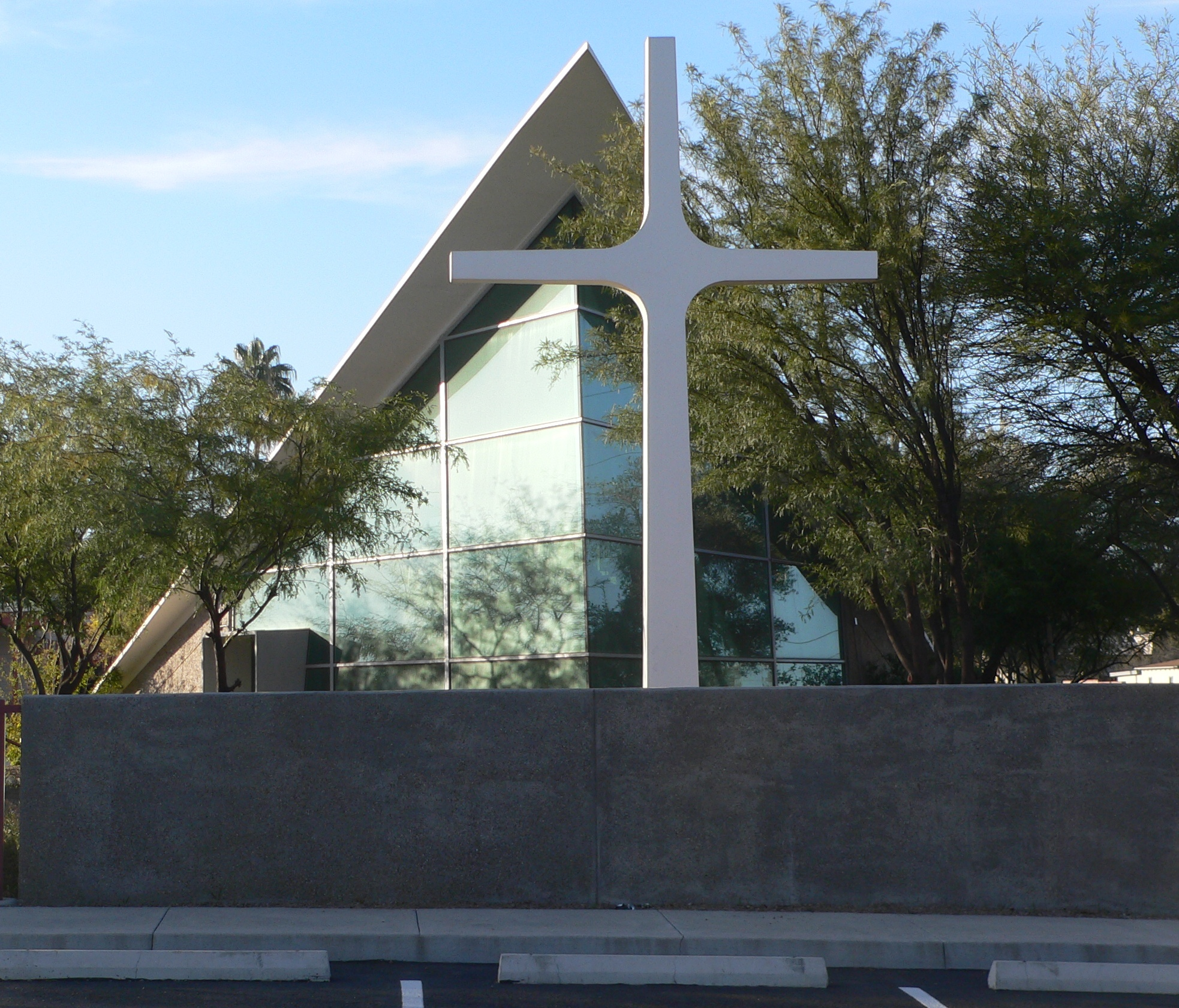

- Location within Arizona Location within the United States
- Location: 1900 N. Country Club Rd., Tucson, Arizona
- Coordinates: 32.2454483°N 110.9266115°W
- Area: less than one acre
- Architect: Charles E. Cox
- Engineer: Rod Gomez
- Architectural style: Modern Movement, Sculptural Expressionism
- NRHP reference No.: 08000430
- Added to NRHP: May 23, 2008

Catalina American Baptist Church (Catalina Baptist Church) is a historic church in Tucson, Arizona. The original sanctuary there was built in 1960–1961. Its "primary character-defining feature...is a thin-shell concrete hyperbolic paraboloid roof." Its walls have floor-to-ceiling glass windows and aggregate concrete.

The church building features notable Modern Movement and Sculptural Expressionism style elements in its design.

A multi-purpose church complex was also built on the property, in 2005.

The building was added to the National Register of Historic Places in 2008.

The building is currently home to Christian Faith Fellowship - A Wesleyan Church.

== See also ==
- Modernist architecture in Arizona
- Modern Movement architecture in the United States
