= Barrio Santa Rosa (Tucson, Arizona) =

- U.S. National Register of Historic Places
- U.S. Historic district
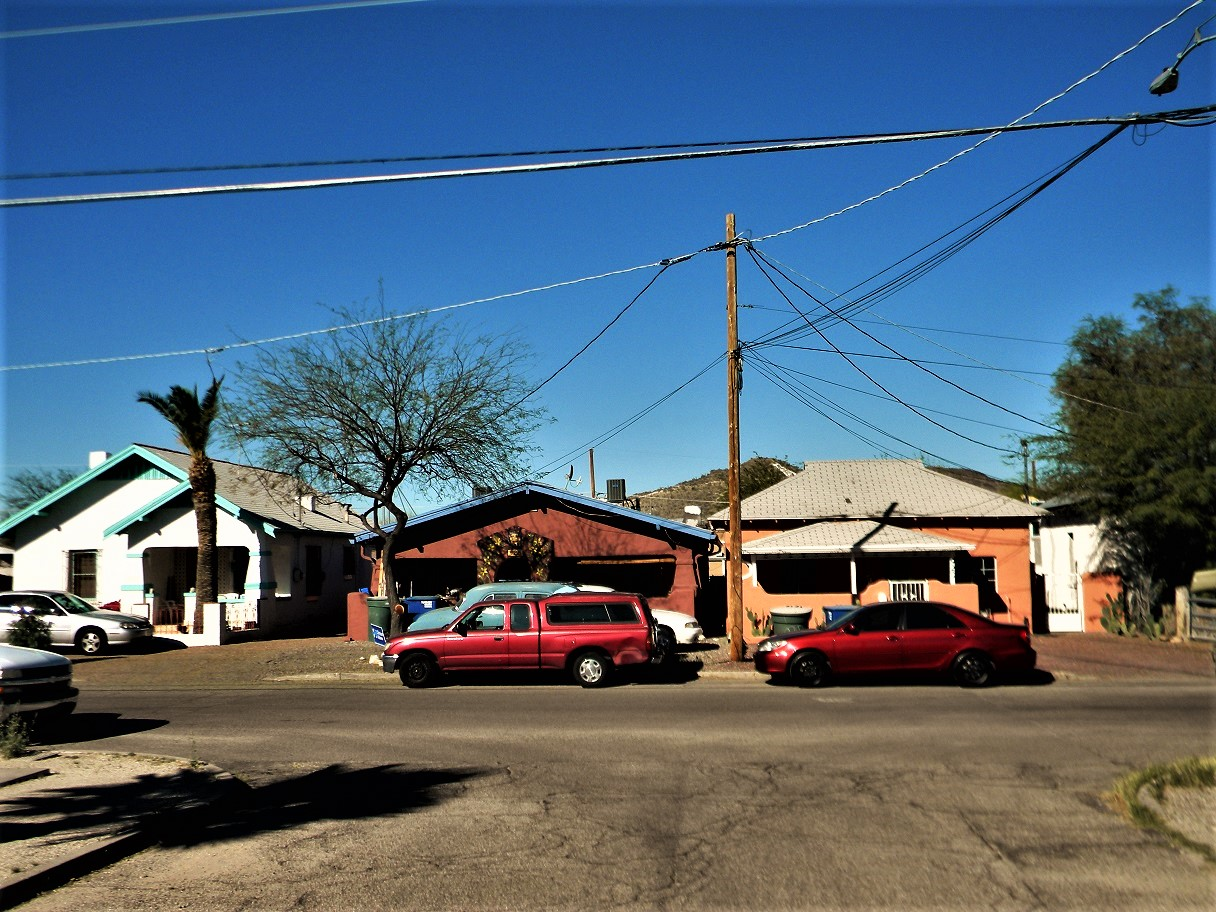

- Location within Arizona Location within the United States
- Location: Roughly bounded by W. 18th St., S. Russell Ave., W. 22nd St., S. 9th Ave., & S. Meyer Ave., Tucson, Arizona
- Coordinates: 32°12′34″N 110°58′15″W
- Area: 30 acres (12 ha)
- NRHP reference No.: 11000683
- Added to NRHP: September 23, 2011

The Barrio Santa Rosa is a neighborhood in Tucson, Arizona that is also a historic district listed on the U.S. National Register of Historic Places on September 23, 2011 . It includes 124 buildings, built in adobe, brick, wood and other materials, in a variety of architectural styles. Architectural styles represented includes traditional Sonoran, Postwar Territorial (Territorial Revival), Queen Anne, Bungalow/Craftsman, Mission/Spanish revival, and modern ranch.

It was named "Best New City Neighborhood" in Tucson by lifestyle magazine Sunset.

The district was listed on the U.S. National Register of Historic Places on September 23, 2011. The listing was announced as the featured listing in the National Park Service's weekly list of September 30, 2011.
