= Armory Park Historic Residential District =

Historic district in Arizona, United States

- U.S. National Register of Historic Places
- U.S. Historic district
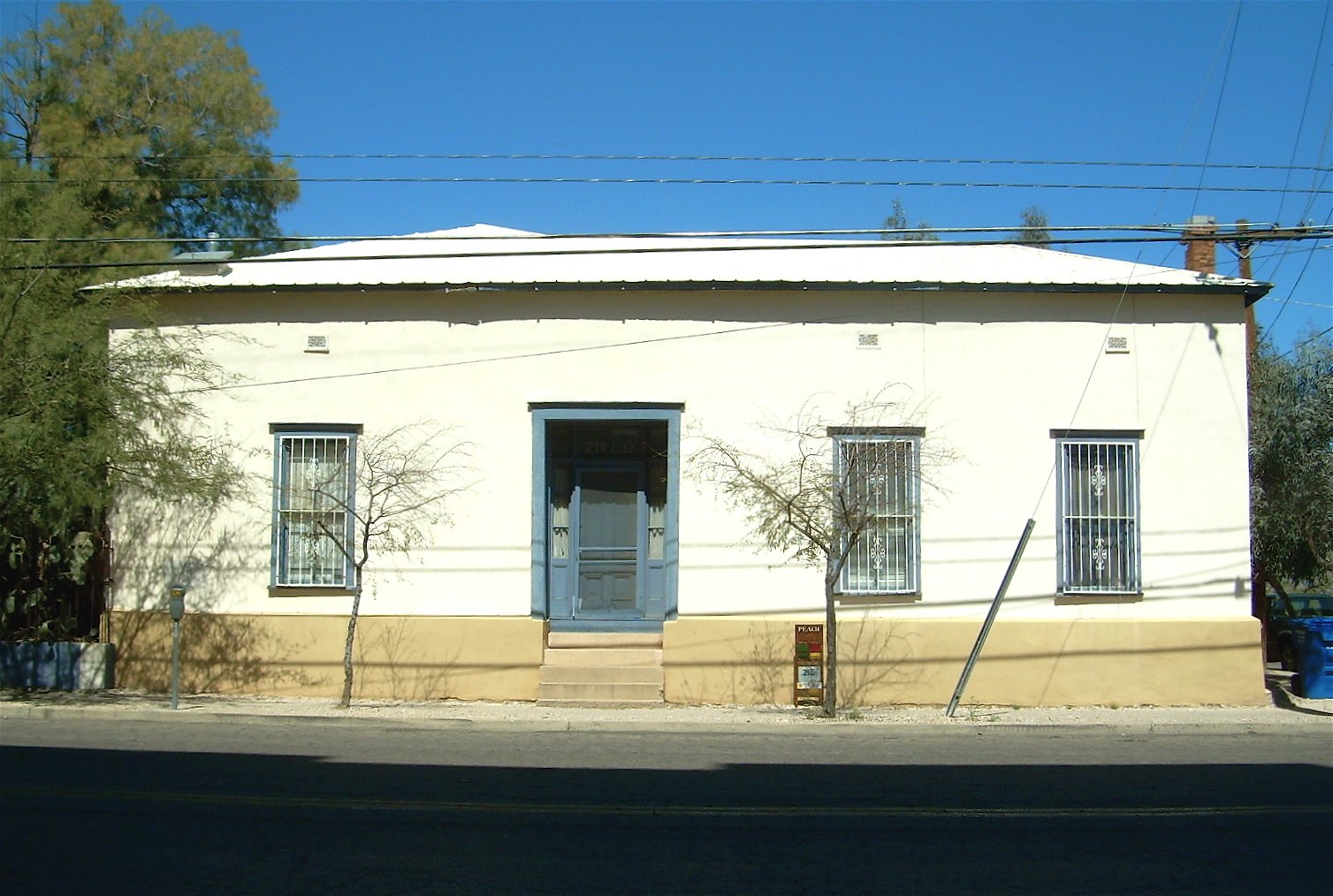
- A 19th-century adobe house in the Armory Park neighborhood

- Location within Arizona Location within the United States
- Location: E. 12th St. to 19th St., Stone Ave. to 2nd Ave., (original); Roughly, 19th, 20th, and 21st Sts. from Stone Ave. to Jacobus Ave. (increase)Tucson, Arizona
- Coordinates: 32°12′56″N 110°57′58″W
- Built: 1880
- Architect: Multiple
- Architectural style: Classical Revival, Queen Anne, Mission/Spanish Revival (original); Late Victorian, Late 19th And 20th Century Revivals, Sonoran (increase)
- NRHP reference No.: 76000378 and 96000754
- Added to NRHP: July 30, 1976 (original); July 05, 1996 (increase)

Armory Park Historic Residential District is a historic district in Tucson, Arizona. It was listed on the NRHP in 1976 and the district boundaries were increased in 1996.

Part of the eastern section of the Armory Park Historic Residential District was first developed as company housing for employees of the Southern Pacific Railroad. When the railroad moved out of this area and combined with Union Pacific Railroad, the houses were auctioned off and moved to other areas.

In 2000, a solar-powered housing development, known as Armory Park del Sol, was built here. Developer John Wesley Miller named the streets in the subdivision after historic people and events of the area, referring to both railroads that were important to its history. This subdivision and its locally themed street names were featured in a December 2013 "Street Smarts" column, published in the Arizona Daily Star newspaper.
