= Old Main (University of Arizona) =

- Old Main, University of Arizona
- U.S. National Register of Historic Places
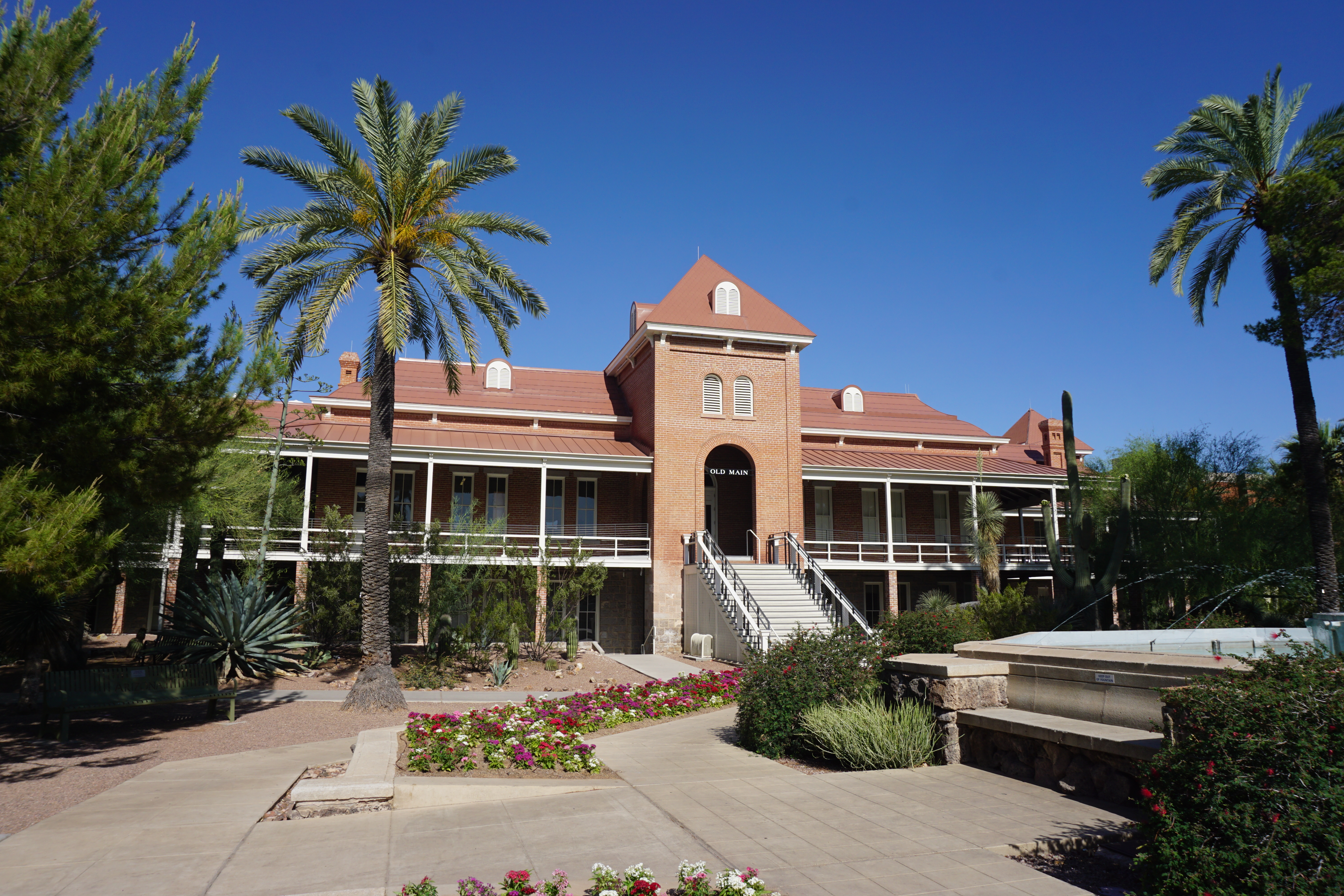

- Location within Arizona Location within the United States
- Location: University of Arizona campus, Tucson, Arizona
- Coordinates: 32°13′55″N 110°57′10″W
- Area: 0.7 acres (0.28 ha)
- Built: 1887-1891
- Architects: Creighton, James M.; Sullivan, M.J.
- Architectural style: Eclectic
- NRHP reference No.: 72000199
- Added to NRHP: April 13, 1972

Old Main, University of Arizona, originally known as the University of Arizona, School of Agriculture building, was the first building constructed on the University of Arizona campus in Tucson, Arizona, United States. Old Main is one of the oldest surviving educational structures in the western United States. It was placed on the National Register of Historic Places in 1972.

Designed by Phoenix architect James Miller Creighton, construction of Old Main began on October 27, 1887. The budget of $37,969 ran out before the roof was finished. When university officials discovered federal loans were available for agricultural schools, they renamed the building from the originally planned School of Mines to the School of Agriculture. Federal funding allowed completion of the building and it opened for the first class of the university on October 1, 1891. Old Main, then the only building on the campus, contained the classrooms, library, offices, and dorms. Six faculty taught 32 students in 1891.

In 1919, the Alexander Berger Memorial Fountain was constructed in front of Old Main. Berger funded the project as a memorial for 13 University of Arizona students who were killed in World War I, including his nephew. Completed for $5500, the fountain was dedicated on January 31, 1920 by General John J. "Blackjack" Pershing.

Due to neglect by the University, Old Main fell into disrepair and was condemned by the City of Tucson in 1938. Demolition was averted when the US Navy repaired the building in 1942, for use as a Naval Indoctrination Training School during World War II. The Navy then paid $20,000 in 1945 to turn it back into a functioning campus building.

The first floor of Old Main was restored and renovated in 2008 at a cost of $4.6 million. It then housed the University's Office of Admissions, Center for Exploratory Students, and the Dean of Student's Office. In January 2013, renovation of the entire building began — including a modernization of the interior spaces, replacing the roof, and framing the porch. It reopened before the 2014-15 academic year. In addition to extensive improvements, the Office of the President was relocated to Old Main.

== Gallery ==
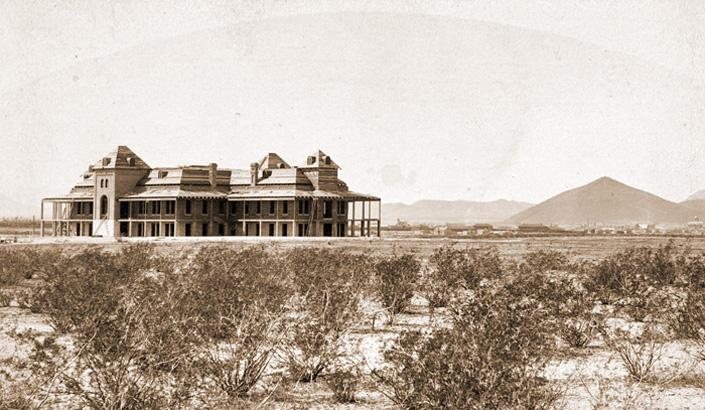
Old Main in 1889

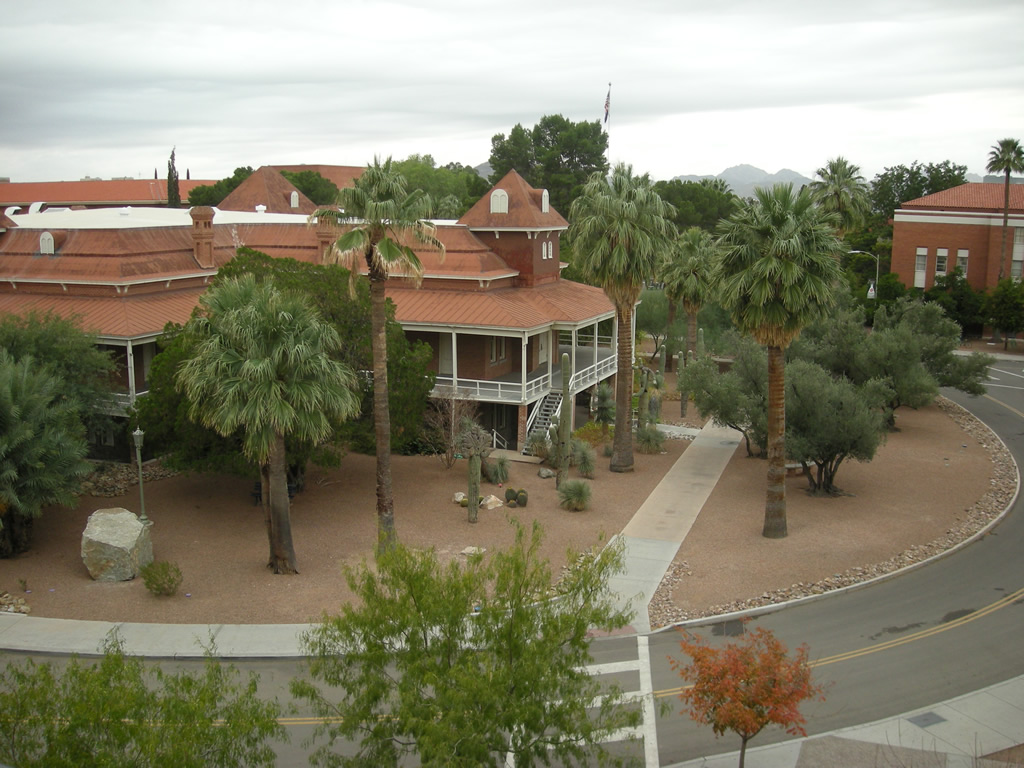
Northeast view of Old Main and the surrounding gardens, 2008

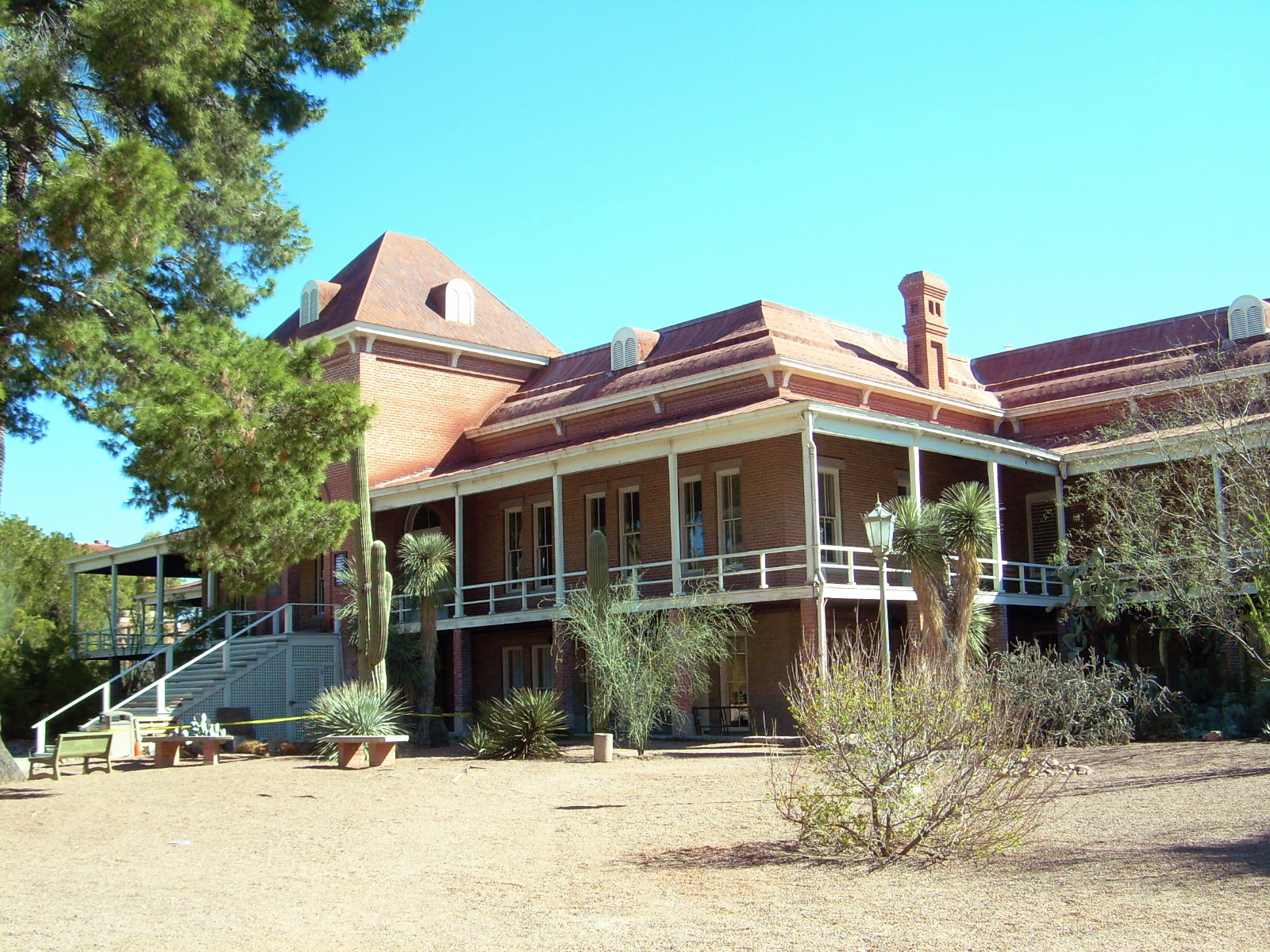
Southwest view

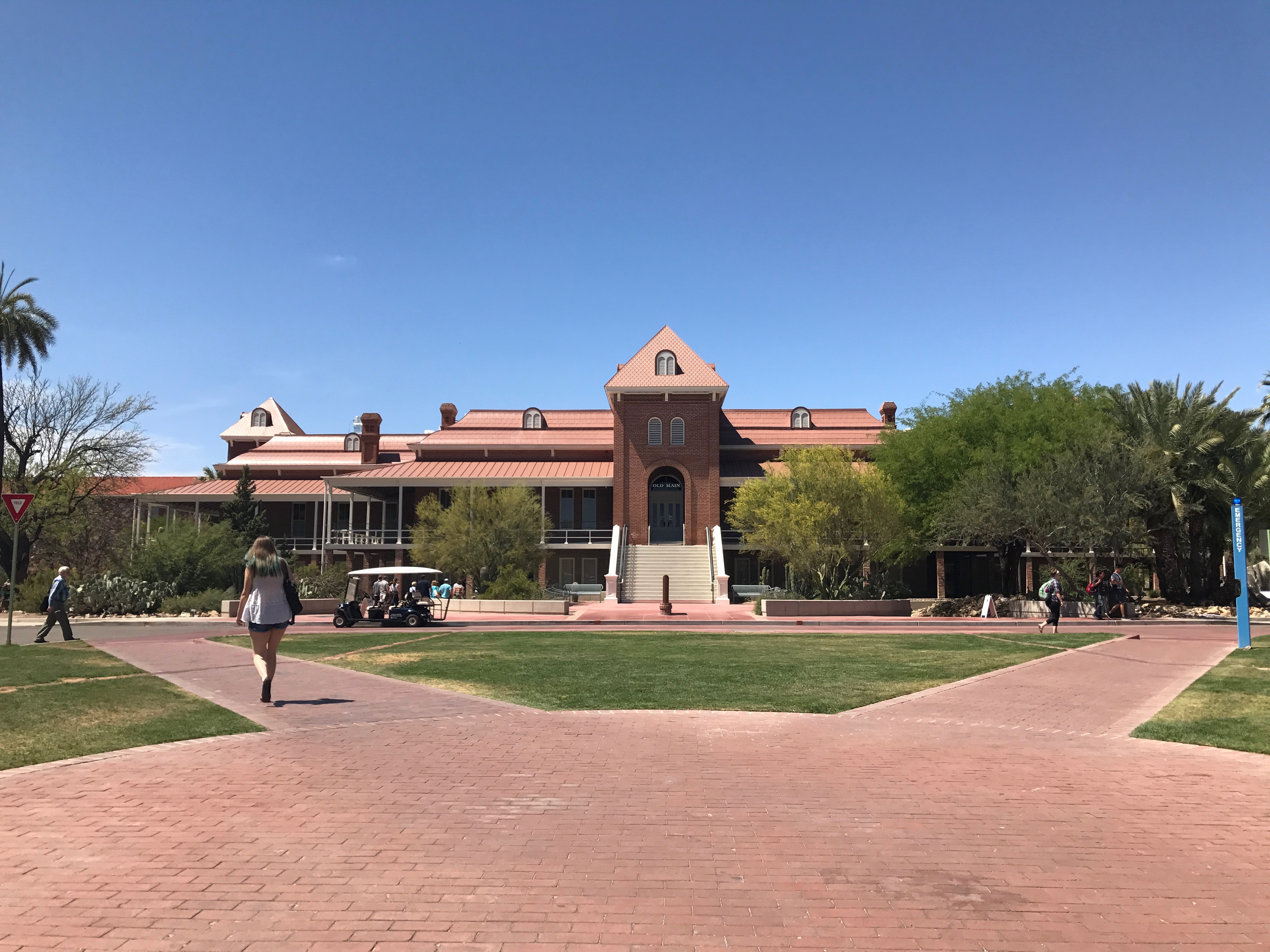
Eastern Façade in April 2017
