= Turk's cap lily =

Turk's cap lily is a common name for several plants and may refer to:

- Lilium martagon, a species native to a wide area from central Europe east to Mongolia and Korea
- Lilium michauxii, a species native to southeastern North America
- Lilium superbum, a species native to eastern and central regions of North America

== See also ==
- Turk's cap
