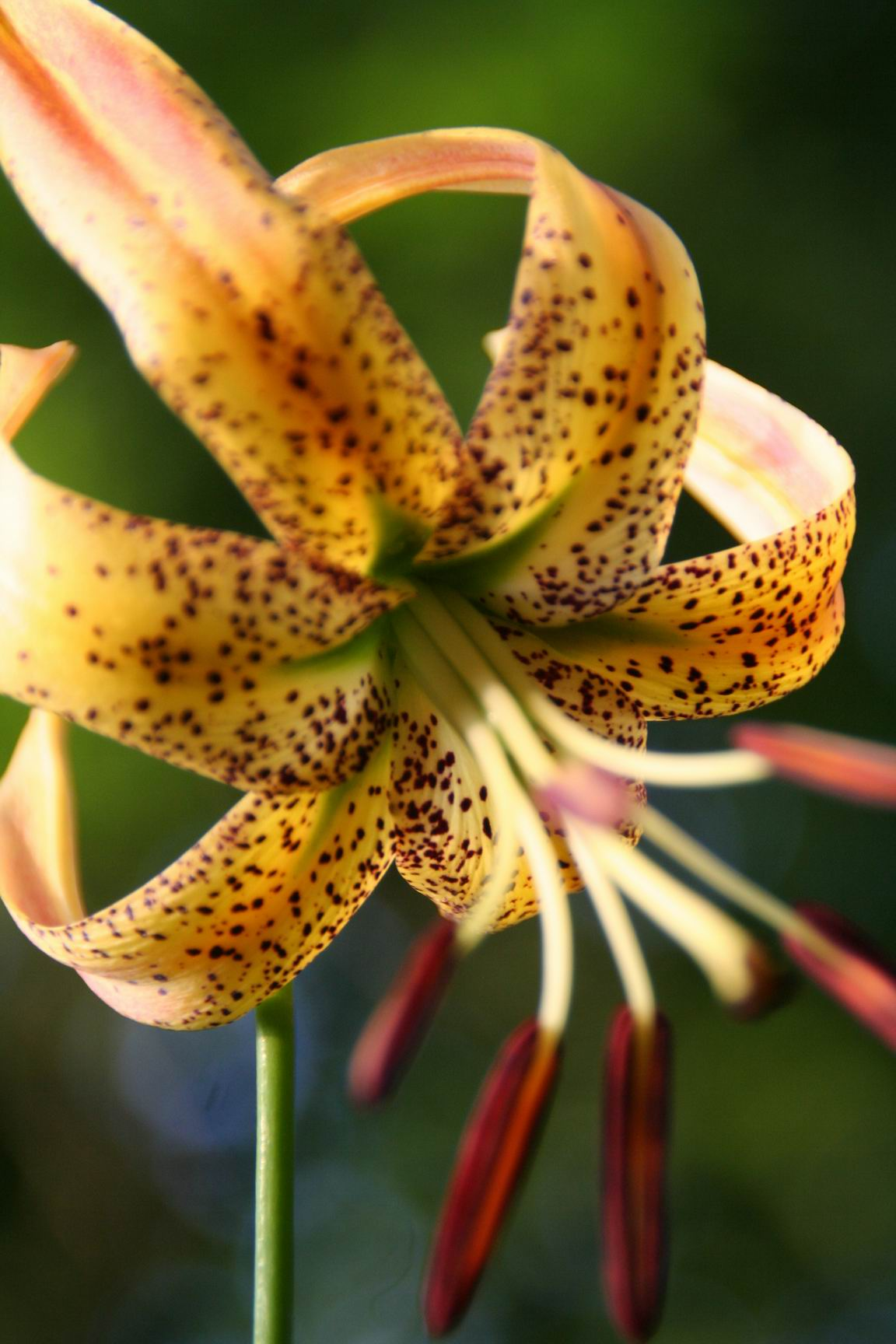

Conservation status
- Imperiled (NatureServe)

Scientific classification
- Kingdom: Plantae
- Clade: Tracheophytes
- Clade: Angiosperms
- Clade: Monocots
- Order: Liliales
- Family: Liliaceae
- Subfamily: Lilioideae
- Tribe: Lilieae
- Genus: Lilium
- Species: L. pyrophilum

Binomial name
- Lilium pyrophilum M.W.Skinner & Sorrie

= Lilium pyrophilum =

Species of lily

Lilium pyrophilum, the sandhills lily or sandhills bog lily, is a North American species of plant in the lily family. It is endemic to the Sandhills region of southern Virginia, North Carolina and northern South Carolina, in the eastern United States.

Lilium pyrophilum produces a rhizomatous bulbous root system which is occasionally branched. The plant grows to 0.6-1.6 m (*) It has long narrow, slightly pointed leaves arranged in a variable number of whorls around the stem. The leaves may be upright or drooping. The yellow or yellow–orange inflorescence is borne on racemes of 1–7 flowers, they are pendant and not fragrant. The petals can be reddish, reddish–orange, dusky red or magenta towards the tip and marked with magenta spots and turned back in a "turks cap" shape. The anthers are magenta or purple. It blooms from late July to mid–August. Lilium pyrophilum is also named the "Sandhills lily" from its restricted location where it benefits from regular brush fires.

Lilium pyrophilum is botanically related to Lilium superbum, with which it may be confused, and Lilium michauxii with which it can cross-pollinate.

By observations it appears that the ruby-throated hummingbirds (Archilocus colubris) may be involved in the pollination of this flower and the Palamedes swallowtail butterfly also pollinates this lily.
