= Plant Collections Network =

North American botanical gardens and arboreta group

Coordinates: 39°52′10″N 75°40′28″W

The Plant Collections Network (PCN) (formerly the North American Plant Collections Consortium) is a group of North American botanical gardens and arboreta that coordinates a continent-wide approach to plant germplasm preservation, and promotes excellence in plant collections management. The program is administered by the American Public Gardens Association from its headquarters in Kennett Square, Pennsylvania, in collaboration with the USDA Agricultural Research Service.

Current objectives of the Plant Collections Network are to:

- Build Awareness – of both Plant Collections Network & value of documented plant collections
- Promote Standards of Excellence – in plant collections management; and
- Expand Diversity of Collections – target existing collections, identify gaps for future collections

The network is intended to represent woody and herbaceous ornamentals, both native and exotic. The main objective for each network member is to assemble a comprehensive group of plants for a particular taxon, collecting plants from different populations throughout their natural range that are both taxonomically and genetically distinct.

Participating institutions maximize the potential value of their collections by making efficient use of available resources through a coordinated continent-wide approach, and strengthening their own collections through collaboration with others.

Criteria for participation in the Plant Collections Network are:

- American Public Gardens Association membership
- Active collections management program including plant records database, accession labels, maps
- Long-term commitment to maintain collection
- Endorsement of governing body
- Current collection has 50% or more of ultimate collection scope
- Collections policy
- Curator for collection; and
- Access to collection for research, evaluation and plant introduction

The accreditation process includes submitting a written application for each collection to be considered, then a peer site reviewer conducts an onsite assessment and submits a report with recommendations.

As of March 2016, Network participants and Nationally Accredited Plant Collections included:

- Arizona-Sonora Desert Museum
  - Agavaceae – Sonoran Desert; 65 taxa
- Arboretum at Arizona State University
  - Phoenix; 300 taxa, 40 varieties
- Arnold Arboretum of Harvard University
  - Acer; multi-site
  - Carya; 16 taxa, 11 spp
  - Fagus; 26 taxa
  - Stewartia; 11 taxa
  - Syringa; 238 taxa, 20 spp
  - Tsuga; 72 taxa, 7 spp
- Atlanta Botanical Garden
  - Acer; 82 taxa
  - Magnolia; multi-site
  - Sarracenia; 78 taxa
- Bartlett Tree Research Laboratory and Arboretum
  - Acer; multi-site
  - Hamamelis; 161 taxa
  - Magnolia; multi-site
  - Quercus; multi-site
  - Ulmus; 62 taxa
- Betty Ford Alpine Gardens
  - Alpine Plants of Colorado; 87 taxa
- Boyce Thompson Arboretum
  - Fabaceae – Desert Legumes; 1454 taxa as seeds, 206 taxa as plants
  - Quercus; multi-site
- University of British Columbia Botanical Garden
  - Acer; multi-site
  - Magnolia; multi-site
- University of California Botanical Garden at Berkeley
  - Cycads; multi-site
  - Ferns; 360 taxa, with 500+ accessions
  - Magnolia; multi-site
  - Quercus; multi-site
- Cheekwood Botanical Garden
  - Cornus; 61 taxa
- Chicago Botanic Garden
  - Geranium; 102 taxa
  - Quercus; 48 taxa
  - Spiraea; 52 taxa
- Cornell Plantations
  - Acer; multi-site
  - Quercus; multi-site
- Donald E. Davis Arboretum
  - Quercus; multi-site
- University of California Davis Arboretum
  - Quercus; multi-site
- Dawes Arboretum
  - Acer; multi-site
  - Aesculus; 59 taxa
  - Hamamelis; 75 taxa
  - Metasequoia; 9 taxa, with 47 accessions of documented wild-origin, 8 cultivars
- Denver Botanic Gardens
  - Alpine Plants of the World; 223 taxa
  - Quercus; multi-site
- Desert Botanical Garden
  - Agavaceae; 346 taxa
  - Cactaceae; 1319 taxa
- The Arboretum at Flagstaff
  - Penstemon (provisional) – Colorado Plateau, Arizona species; 37 taxa
- University of Florida – North Florida Research and Education Center
  - Magnolia; multi-site
- Fort Worth Botanic Garden
  - Begonia; 1001 taxa
- Fullerton Arboretum (California State University)
  - Citrus; 36 accessions, representing 20 taxa
- Ganna Walska Lotusland
  - Cycads; multi-site
- Green Spring Gardens Park
  - Hamamelis; 80 taxa, including all 4 spp
- Henry Foundation for Botanical Research
  - Magnolia; multi-site
- Highstead Arboretum
  - Kalmia; 82 taxa, including 3 spp, 76 cultivars, 4 forms, 2 hybrids
- Holden Arboretum
  - Quercus; multi-site
- Hoyt Arboretum
  - Acer; multi-site
  - Magnolia; multi-site
- The Huntington Botanical Gardens
  - Camellia; 1240 taxa, including 40 spp, 1200 cultivars
- Huntsville Botanical Garden
  - Trillium; 66 taxa, including 28 spp
- Idaho Botanical Garden
  - Penstemon – Western US (provisional); 33 taxa
- Jenkins Arboretum
  - Kalmia; 48 taxa
  - Rhododendron; 1861 taxa
- Jensen-Olson Arboretum
  - Primula; 65 taxa
- George Landis Arboretum
  - Quercus of the Northeast U.S.; 14 taxa, 9 spp
- Springs Preserve
  - Mojave Desert Cacti and Succulents; 28 taxa
- Longwood Gardens
  - Nymphaea; 136 taxa
  - Buxus; 3 taxa, 111 accessions
  - Chrysanthemum; 47 taxa
  - Pierce's Trees; 50 taxa
- Matthaei Botanical Gardens and Nichols Arboretum
  - Paeonia; 317 taxa, with 467 plants
- Mendocino Coast Botanical Gardens
  - Heath and Heather; 134 taxa
- University of Minnesota Landscape Arboretum
  - Grasses; 184 taxa
  - Pinus; 60 taxa
- Missouri Botanical Garden
  - Quercus; multi-site
- Montgomery Botanical Center
  - Arecaceae; 356 taxa
  - Cycads; multi-site
- Montreal Botanical Garden
  - Rosa; 1097 taxa, including 115 spp
- Moore Farms Botanical Garden
  - Magnolia; multi-site
- Morris Arboretum of the University of Pennsylvania
  - Abies; 35 taxa, including cultivars
  - Acer; multi-site
  - Quercus; multi-site
- Morton Arboretum
  - Acer; multi-site
  - Magnolia; multi-site
  - Malus; 185 taxa, 9 out of 10 known species, plus cultivars
  - Quercus; multi-site
  - Tilia; 45 taxa
  - Ulmus; 78 taxa, 35 spp, 43 hybrids and cultivars
- Mount Auburn Cemetery
  - Quercus; multi-site
- Mt. Cuba Center
  - Hexastylis; 39 taxa, including 10 spp
  - Trillium; 84 taxa
- Naples Botanical Garden
  - Plumeria; 585 taxa
- New England Wild Flower Society
  - Trillium; 28 taxa
- New York Botanical Garden
  - Acer; multi-site
  - Quercus; multi-site
- Norfolk Botanical Garden
  - Camellia; 525 taxa
  - Hydrangea; 190 taxa
  - Lagerstroemia; 75 taxa
- North Carolina Arboretum
  - Rhododendron; 15 spp, native azaleas
- Phipps Conservatory and Botanical Gardens
  - subfamily Cypripedioideae; 352 taxa
- Polly Hill Arboretum
  - Stewartia; 19 taxa
- Powell Gardens
  - Magnolia; multi-site
- Quarryhill Botanical Garden
  - Acer; multi-site
  - Magnolia (provisional)
- Rancho Santa Ana Botanic Garden
  - Quercus; multi-site
- JC Raulston Arboretum
  - Cercis; 40 taxa, including 7 spp, 33 cultivars
  - Magnolia; multi-site
- Reiman Gardens at Iowa State University
  - Griffith Buck Roses; 75 cultivars
- Rhododendron Species Foundation and Botanical Garden
  - Rhododendron subsect. Fortunea; 15 taxa, with 104 accessions
- Rogerson Clematis Garden
  - Clematis; 709 taxa
- San Diego Botanic Garden
  - Bamboo; 121 taxa
- San Diego Zoo Global
  - Cycads; multi-site
  - Orchids; 907 taxa
- San Francisco Botanical Garden at Strybing Arboretum
  - Arecaceae – high elevation; 107 taxa
  - Magnolia; multi-site
  - Mesoamerican Cloud Forest; 550 taxa, primarily from tropical mountains of southern Mexico and Central America
- Santa Barbara Botanic Garden
  - Dudleya; 52 taxa
- Scott Arboretum of Swarthmore College
  - Ilex; 312 taxa
  - Magnolia; multi-site
  - Quercus; multi-site
- Smithsonian Gardens
  - Orchids – tropical species; 2400 accessions
- South Carolina Botanical Garden
  - Magnolia; multi-site
- Starhill Forest Arboretum
  - Quercus; multi-site
- Taltree Arboretum and Gardens
  - Quercus; multi-site
- Toledo Botanical Garden
  - Hosta; 495 taxa, including 43 spp, 452 cultivars, with 2500 accessions
- Tyler Arboretum
  - Rhododendron; 529 taxa, with 1493 accessions
- United States National Arboretum
  - Buxus; 190 taxa
- University of Washington Botanic Gardens
  - Acer; multi-site
  - Ilex; 47 taxa
  - Magnolia; multi-site
  - Quercus; multi-site
- VanDusen Botanical Garden
  - Magnolia (provisional)

== See also ==
- List of botanical gardens and arboretums in the United States
- National Plant Collection – British plant collections program
