= Turk's cap =

Turk's cap is a common name for several plants and may refer to:

- Lilium martagon, a lily species native to a wide area from central Europe east to Mongolia and Korea
- Lilium michauxii, a lily species native to southeastern North America
- Lilium superbum, a lily species native to eastern and central regions of North America
- Melocactus, a genus of cactus native to North and South America, many species of which are called Turk's-cap cactus
- Malvaviscus, a genus of mallows native to North and South America, especially Malvaviscus arboreus and Malvaviscus penduliflorus, called Turk's cap or Turk's-cap mallow

== See also ==
- Turban squash, a variety of squash also referred to as "Turk's turban"
