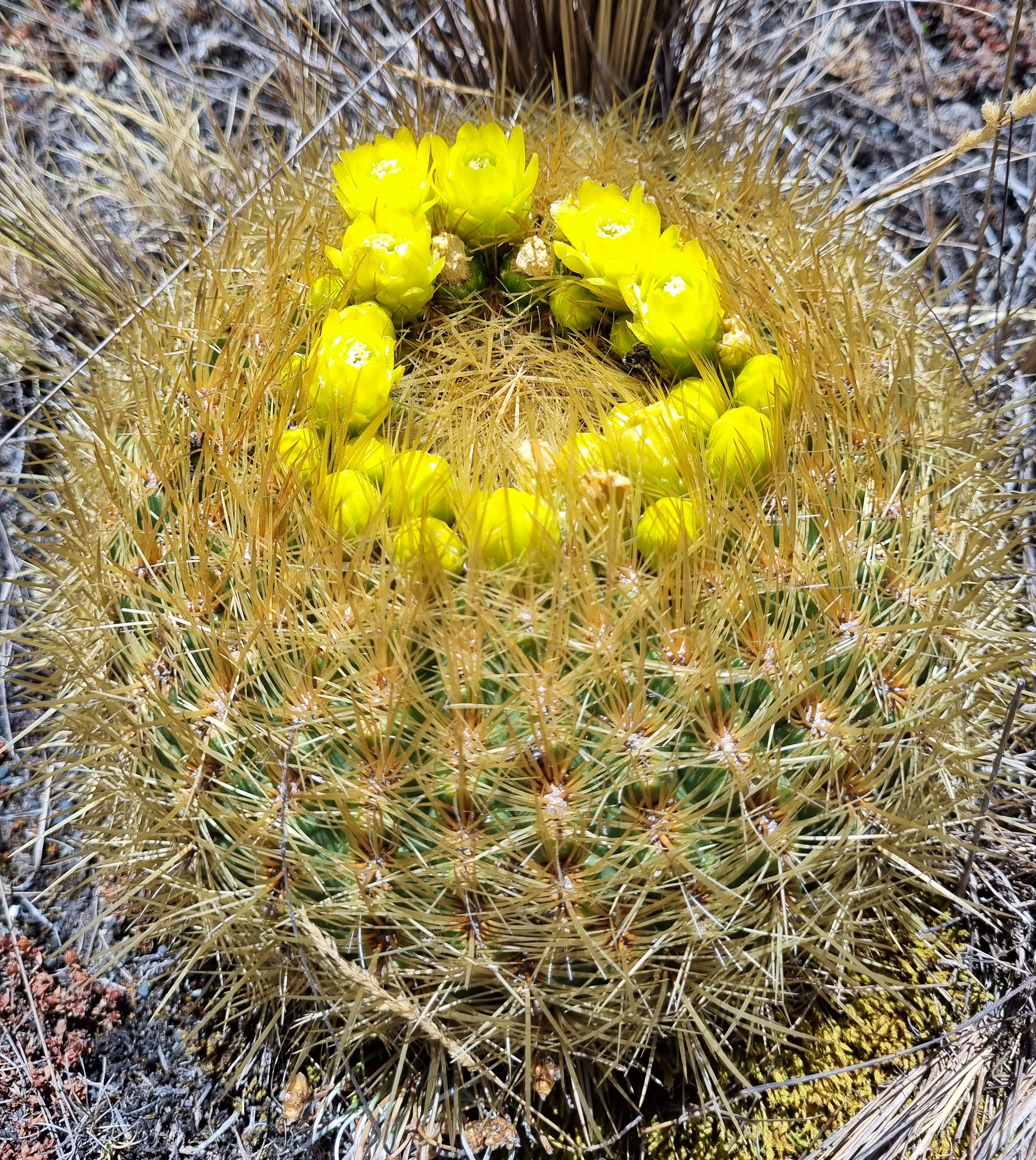

Conservation status
- Least Concern (IUCN 3.1)

Scientific classification
- Kingdom: Plantae
- Clade: Tracheophytes
- Clade: Angiosperms
- Clade: Eudicots
- Order: Caryophyllales
- Family: Cactaceae
- Subfamily: Cactoideae
- Genus: Matucana
- Species: M. borchersii

Binomial name
- Matucana borchersii (Boed.) G.J.Charles

Synonyms
- Echinocactus borchersii Boed. 1933; Oroya borchersii (Boed.) Backeb. 1958; Oroya borchersii var. fuscata Rauh & Backeb. 1956 publ. 1957; Oroya borchersii f. fuscata (Rauh & Backeb.) Krainz 1963

= Matucana borchersii =

Species of cactus

Matucana borchersii is a species of cacti (family Cactaceae), originating from Peru

== Description ==
Matucana borchersii grows individually or forms groups with shoots that reach heights of 12 to 32 cm (4.7 to 12.6 in) with diameters of 15 to 22 cm (5.9 to 8.7 in). There are 12 to 30 ribs. The brown areoles are elongated. The yellowish to reddish brown, 2 to 2.5 cm (0.79 to 0.98 in) long spines are difficult to distinguish between central and peripheral spines. There are 1 to 3 central spines and 25 to 30 thin, needle-like to bristle-like, comb-shaped radial spines.

The yellow to greenish yellow flowers are up to 2 cm (0.79 in) long and reach a diameter of 1.5 cm (0.59 in). The club-shaped fruits are yellow-green and up to 2.5 cm (0.98 in) long.

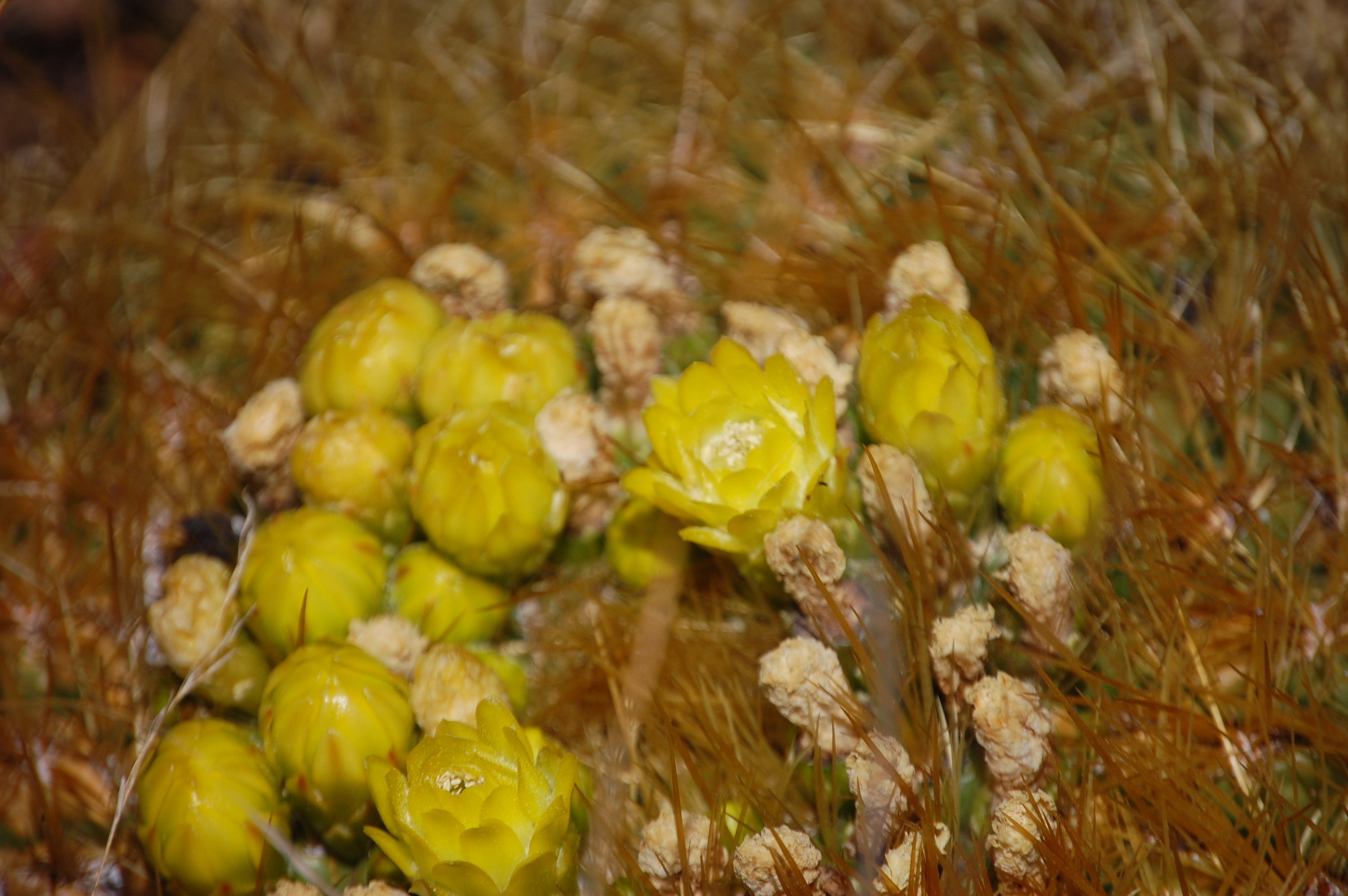
Flowers closeup in habitat

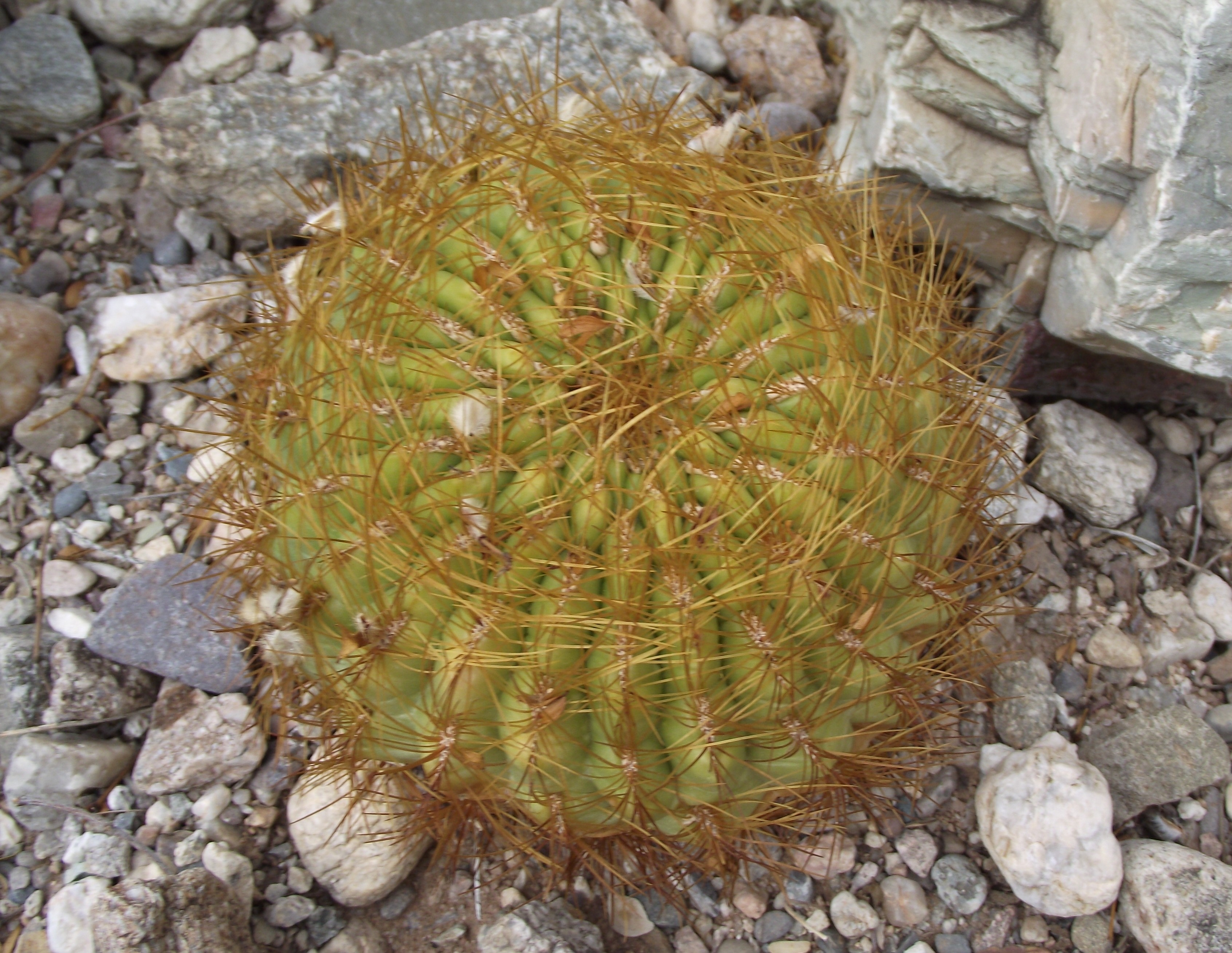
Plant growing in Tucson Botanical Gardens, Tucson, Arizona

== Distribution ==
Matucana borchersii is widespread in the Ancash region of Peru in the Cordillera Blanca and the Cordillera Negra at altitudes of 3900 to 4300 meters.

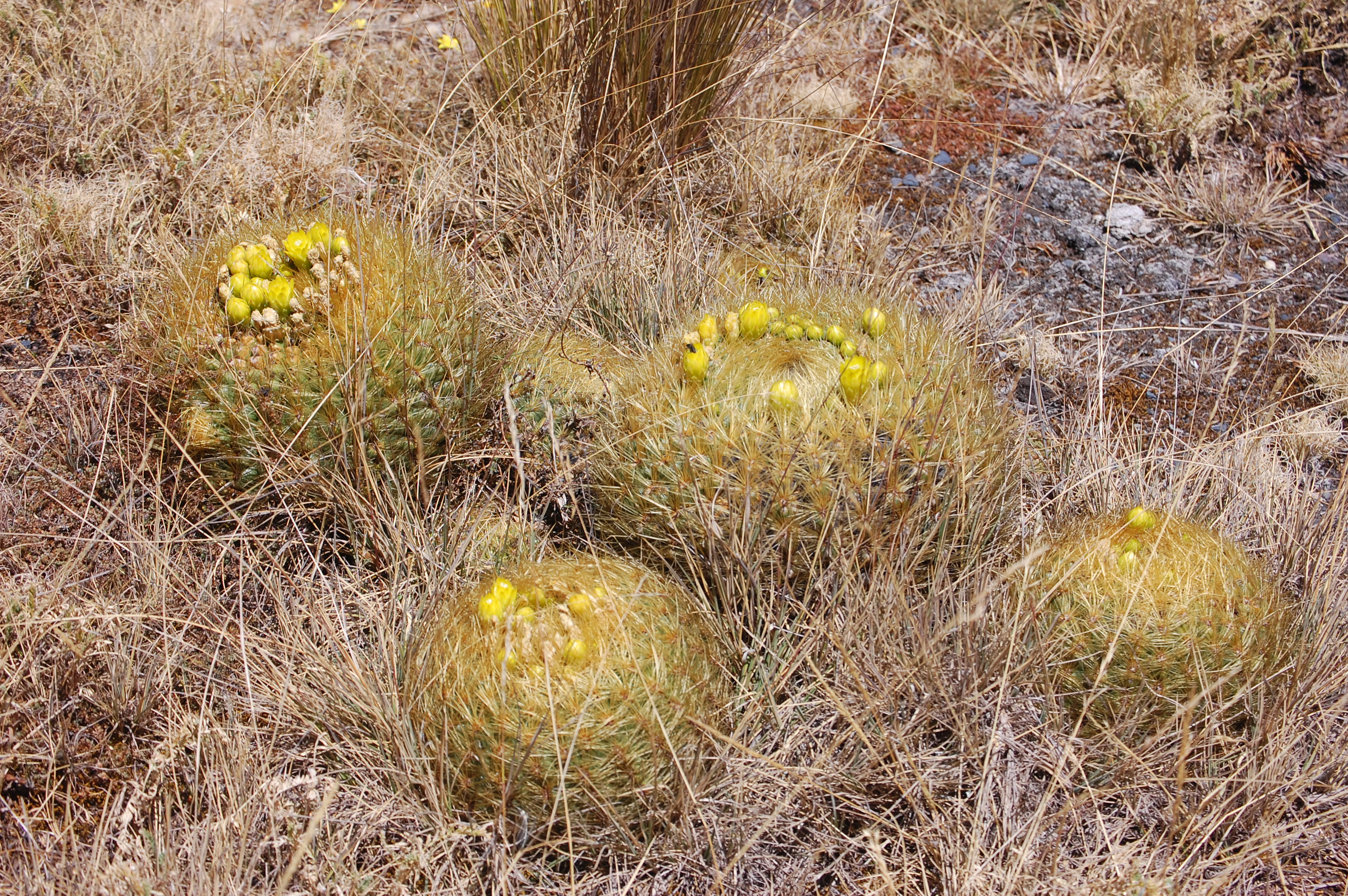
Plants growing in habitat in Ancash

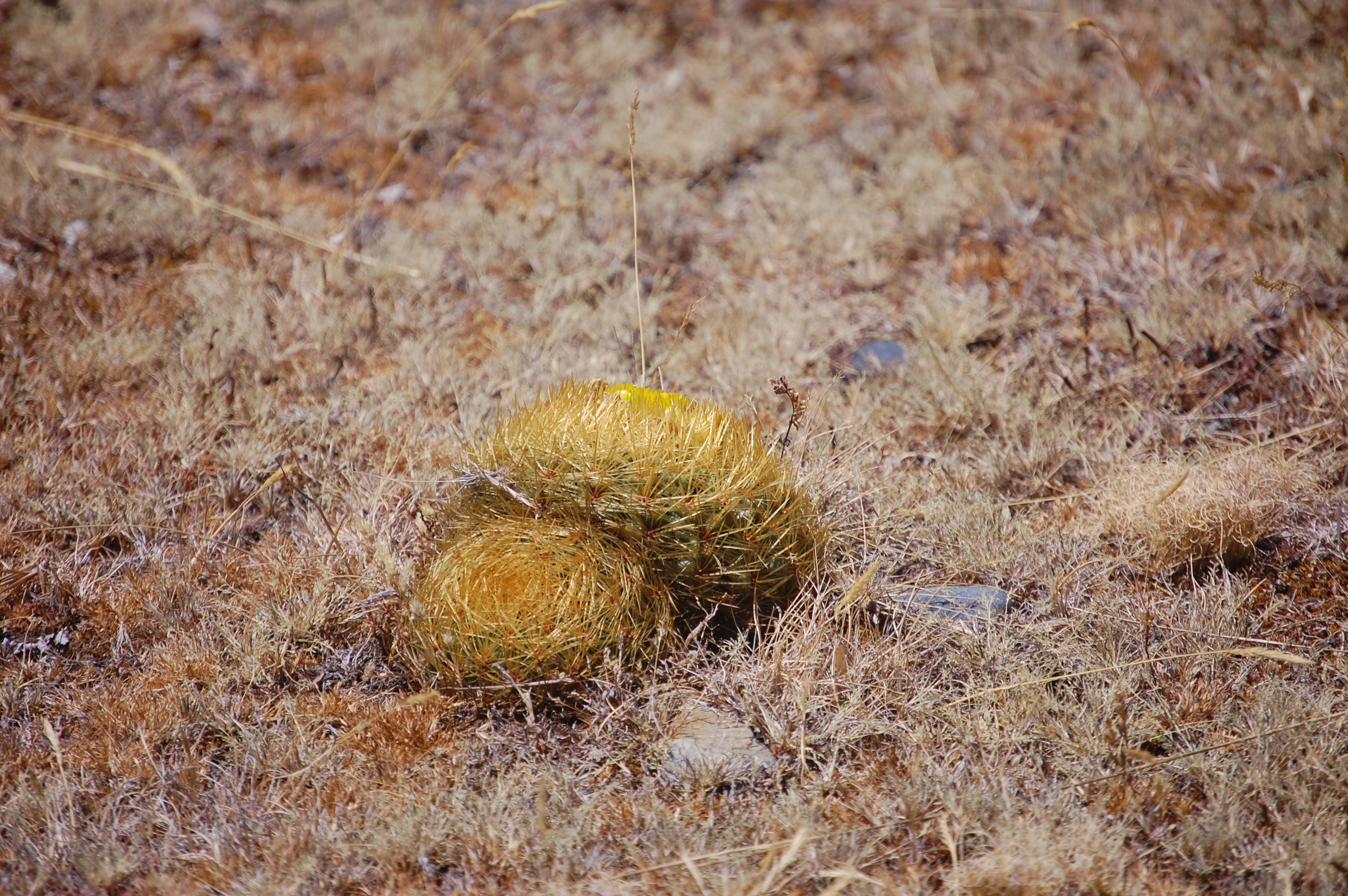

== Taxonomy ==
The first description as Echinocactus borchersii was published in 1933 by Friedrich Bödeker. Curt Backeberg placed the species in the genus Oroya in 1958.
