= Shut-In Ridge Trail Run =

Running event in North Carolina, United States

The Shut-In Ridge Trail Run / Race is a 17.8 mile endurance running event that takes place in the mountains near Asheville, NC. The route begins in the North Carolina Arboretum and ascends approximately 5,000 feet, with a finish line at the top of Mt. Pisgah. The last two miles are steep and technical, to such an extreme that observers may see "runners hanging on to trees to keep from falling backward".

== History ==
The Shut-In Ridge Trail Run event officially began in December 1980 when 64 runners ran the same 17.8 mile route that George Vanderbilt used to get from his Asheville mansion (Biltmore Estate) to his mountaintop hunting lodge. Shut-In Ridge is among the oldest running events in the United States.
