= List of botanical gardens and arboretums in Arizona =

This list of botanical gardens and arboretums in Arizona is intended to include all significant botanical gardens and arboretums in the U.S. state of Arizona.

Name	Image	Affiliation	City	Coordinates
Arboretum at Arizona State University		Arizona State University	Tempe	33°25′33″N 111°55′49″W
The Arboretum at Flagstaff			Flagstaff	35°9′37″N 111°43′53″W
Arizona-Sonora Desert Museum			Tucson	32°14′38″N 111°10′5″W
Boyce Thompson Arboretum			Superior	33°16′45″N 111°9′30″W
Desert Botanical Garden			Phoenix	33°27′47″N 111°56′38″W
Forever Ranch and Gardens			Near Yucca	34°52′20″N 114°8′58″W
Navajo Nation Zoological and Botanical Park		Navajo Nation	Window Rock	35°39′58″N 109°2′56″W
Tohono Chul Park			Tucson	32°20′23″N 110°58′52″W
Tucson Botanical Gardens			Tucson	32°14′54″N 110°54′32″W
University of Arizona Campus Arboretum		University of Arizona	Tucson	32°13′54.7″N 110°57′12.4″W

== See also ==
- List of botanical gardens and arboretums in the United States
- Gardens in Arizona
