= Highstead Foundation =

Botanical garden in Connecticut, US

Coordinates: 41.3251°N 73.3878°W

Highstead, formerly known as Highstead Arboretum, in Redding, Connecticut, United States was founded in 1982. It covers 36 acres (146,000 m^{2}) of woodland, meadow, and wetland and ranges from 640 feet (200 m) to 758 feet (231 m) in elevation and hosts both native and cultivated plant varieties.

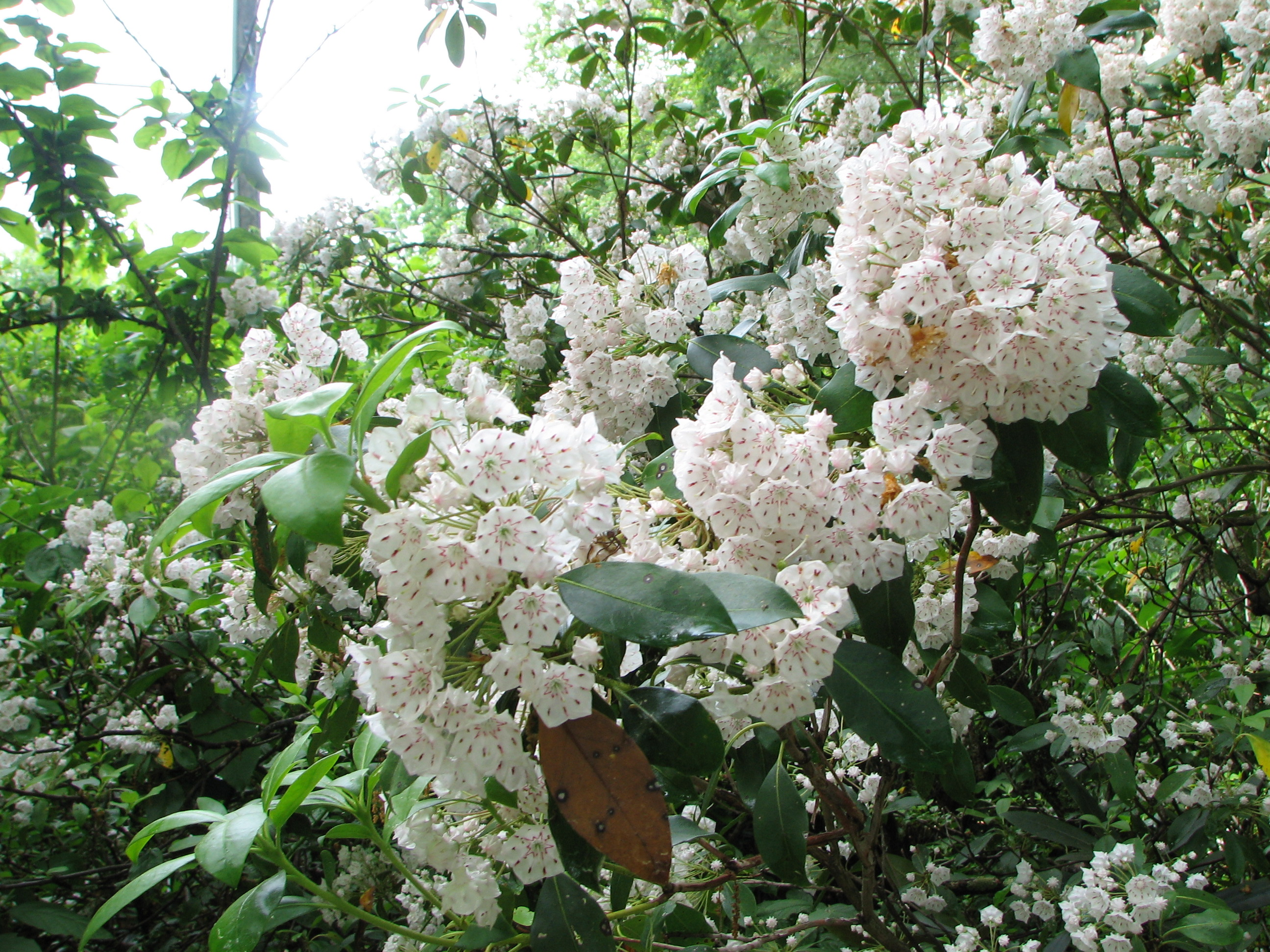
Highstead Foundation

Highstead includes the following collections:

- The Native tree and shrub collection, with indigenous plants from within a 100-mile (160 km) radius of the arboretum.
- The Mountain Laurel collection, includes three of the seven mountain laurel, or Kalmia, species. Highstead is host to a thorough collection of Kalmia latifolia, the Connecticut state flower, and a representative collection of the genus, for which it is also the International Cultivar Registration Authority.
- The Deciduous Azaleas collection, with 14 species of deciduous azaleas, including three native species.
- A Herbarium with more than 1,000 specimens.

== See also ==
- List of botanical gardens in the United States
- North American Plant Collections Consortium
