= Henry Foundation for Botanical Research =

Nonprofit botanical garden in Gladwyne, Pennsylvania, United States

- Interactive map of Henry Foundation for Botanical Research
- Type: botanical garden
- Location: Gladwyne, Pennsylvania, US
- Coordinates: 40°02′N 75°17′W
- Area: 50 acres (20 ha)
- Created: 1948
- Website: www.henrybotanicgarden.org

The Henry Foundation for Botanical Research is a nonprofit botanical garden of 50 acres located in Lower Merion Township, Pennsylvania at 801 Stony Lane, Gladwyne.

The garden was established in 1948 by botanist and plant explorer Mary Gibson Henry (1884–1967) for plants that she collected through remote areas of the West, Midwest, and Southeast United States. The garden has been maintained by the Foundation since 1950.

Today the garden contains scenic plantings, gardens, and trails for walking and horseback riding set among steep hills along Rock Creek, near the Schuylkill River. It also contains 15 taxa of native magnolias, in a program established under the auspices of the North American Plant Collections Consortium (NAPCC) to help broaden the genetic diversity of organized botanical collections.

== See also ==
- List of botanical gardens in the United States
- North American Plant Collections Consortium
