= Scott Arboretum =

Arboretum in Swarthmore, Pennsylvania, United States

Scott Arboretum & Gardens
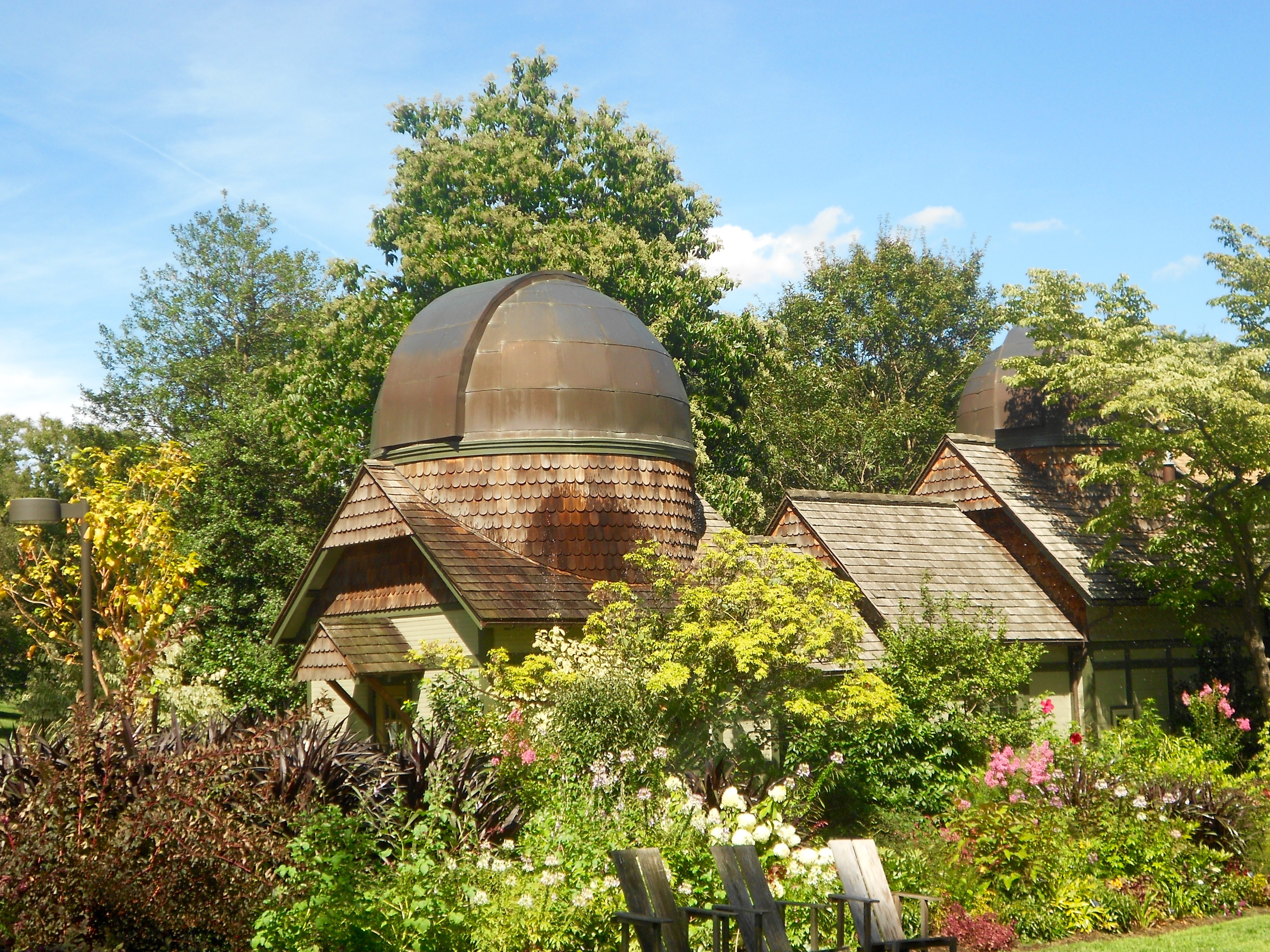
- Interactive map of Scott Arboretum & Gardens
- Type: Arboretum, Botanical garden
- Location: 500 College Ave, Swarthmore, PA 19081, USA
- Area: 357 acres (144 ha)
- Owner: Swarthmore College
- Website: www.scottarboretum.org

Scott Arboretum is a 357 acres (144 ha) arboretum coterminous with the campus of and operated by Swarthmore College. It is open to the public daily without charge. The arboretum was established and endowed by the Scott family in 1929 in honor of Arthur Hoyt Scott (class of 1895, inventor of the paper towel), "for the purpose of enabling Swarthmore College to acquire, cultivate and propagate the better kinds of living trees, shrubs and herbaceous plants which are hardy in the climate of eastern Pennsylvania and which are suitable for planting by the average gardener."

Today the arboretum contains over 4,000 kinds of ornamental plants, labeled with scientific and common names, and grouped in collections for ready comparison. It is "celebrated for its horticultural excellence and display" and "grants Swarthmore’s 1,500 students an academic life immersed in the plant kingdom, although the arboretum welcomes visitors as well."

Each year, the Scott Outdoor Amphitheater plays host to the commencement ceremony of approximately 350 graduating seniors. The amphitheater consists of eight tiers, grassed, and edged in stone. Tulip trees "rise like columns" to create a sylvan take on the Classical Greek Amphitheater. Each year, the Dean Bond Rose Garden supplies the roses that are cut in full bloom and pinned to each graduation gown.

== Select gardens and collections ==
- Crum Woods – 200-acre (0.81 km^{2}) woodland with walking trails.
- Dean Bond Rose Garden – over 650 roses of more than 200 types.
- James R. Frorer Holly Collection – over 350 different types of holly.
- Pinetum – pines, spruces, firs, and other conifers.

== See also ==
- List of botanical gardens in the United States
- North American Plant Collections Consortium
