= Arboretum at Arizona State University =

Exhibit sites at ASU

Coordinates: 33°25′33″N 111°55′49″W

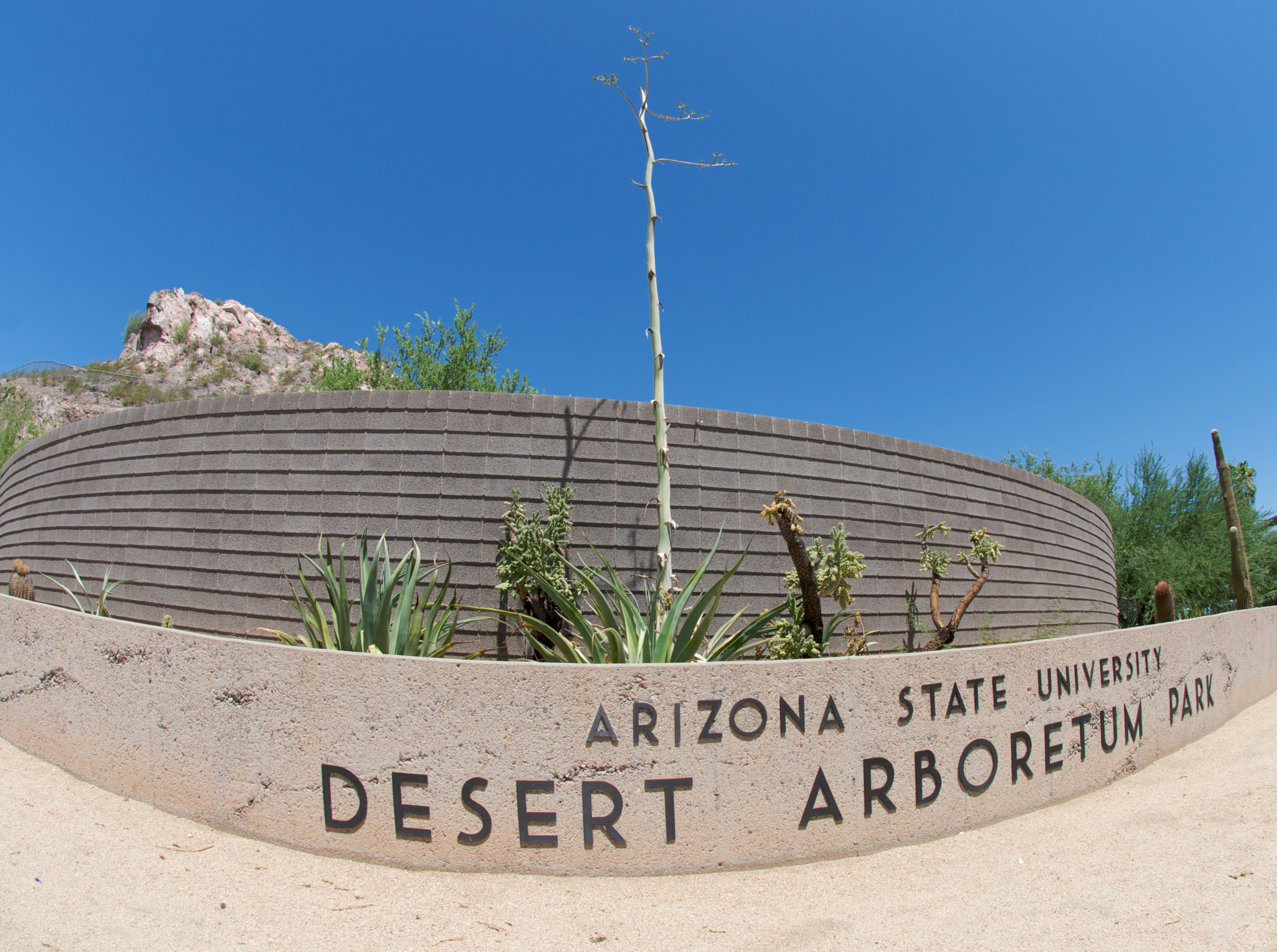

The Arboretum at Arizona State University is an arboretum located in small exhibit sites scattered across walkways and open areas throughout the campus of the Arizona State University in Tempe, Arizona. All of the sites are open to the public daily without charge, since the campus' public areas are not shut off from city streets.

The arboretum was formally dedicated in 1990, and now includes over 300 species from the Sonoran Desert and other regions. It contains one of the best collections of date palms and conifers in the desert Southwest, as well as a growing collection of native southwestern plants. Major collections currently include:

- Conifers
- Deciduous trees
- Evergreens
- Fruit trees
- Palms

== See also ==
- List of botanical gardens and arboretums in Arizona
- List of botanical gardens in the United States
- North American Plant Collections Consortium
