= Mary Gibson Henry =

American botanist

Mary Gibson Henry (1884 – April 1967) was an American botanist and plant collector from Lower Merion Township, Pennsylvania, near Philadelphia, who also served as president of the American Horticultural Society. The daylily Hymenocallis henryae is named in her honor.

== Early life and education ==
Mary Gibson Henry was born near Jenkintown, Pennsylvaniato Susan Worrell Pepper and John Howard Gibson in 1884. The family was known for their horticultural pursuits. Most notably, in 1828, her great-grandfather, George Pepper, was a member of the first Council of the Pennsylvania Horticulture Society. Her formal education ended in 1902 when she graduated the Agnes Irwin School in Philadelphia.

== Career ==
Henry created and maintained gardens and greenhouses at the property where she lived. She cultivated a large kitchen garden, native rock plants, and orchards. Most of her knowledge came from foreign nursery catalogs and seed lists from the U.S. Department of Agriculture. She visited the Royal Botanic Garden in Edinburgh in 1923. Following her visit, she began corresponding with William Wright Smith, the Regius Keeper at the institution, until he died in 1956. She also corresponded with Francis Pennell, curator of botany at the Academy of Natural Sciences in Philadelphia. She went on biannual collecting trips starting in 1929 inspired by William Bartram whose description of Rhododendron speciosum inspired her search for interesting specimens that she couldn't find in commercial or botanical gardens. On her first collecting trip, her husband and four children joined her. Over the next forty years, she went on over 200 botanical expeditions.

After her five children had grown up, she set out collecting in her chauffeured car to remote areas of the American coastal plain, piedmont, and Appalachian Mountains, and in later ventures to the Ozarks and then the Rocky Mountains from New Mexico to British Columbia. As she recalled in her memoirs:

"I soon learned that rare and beautiful plants can only be found in places that are difficult of access ... Often one has to shove one's self through or wriggle under briars, with awkward results to clothing and many and deep cuts and scratches ... Wading, usually barelegged, through countless rattlesnake-infested swamps adds immensely to the interest of the day's work."

At one point she and her daughter were held up by three armed men. As she later observed:

"It all took place so quickly we felt as though we were at the movies. I had often wondered how it would feel to be held up and really it was not so bad at all."

She was president of the Philadelphia Botanical Club, council member of the Pennsylvania Horticultural Society and director of the American Horticultural Society. She became a research associate at the Academy of Natural Sciences in 1941. Her garden was permanently endowed as the Henry Foundation for Botanical Research in 1950.

== Family ==
She married John Norman Henry, a physician, in 1909.

== Death and legacy ==
In April 1967, Henry died in North Carolina on a collecting trip. Her 50-acre (200,000 m^{2}) private botanical garden has now become the nonprofit Henry Foundation for Botanical Research, and is open to the public.

== See also ==
- Henry Foundation for Botanical Research
