= North Carolina Arboretum =

Arboretum and botanical garden in North Carolina, United States

Coordinates: 35.4976°N 82.6090°W

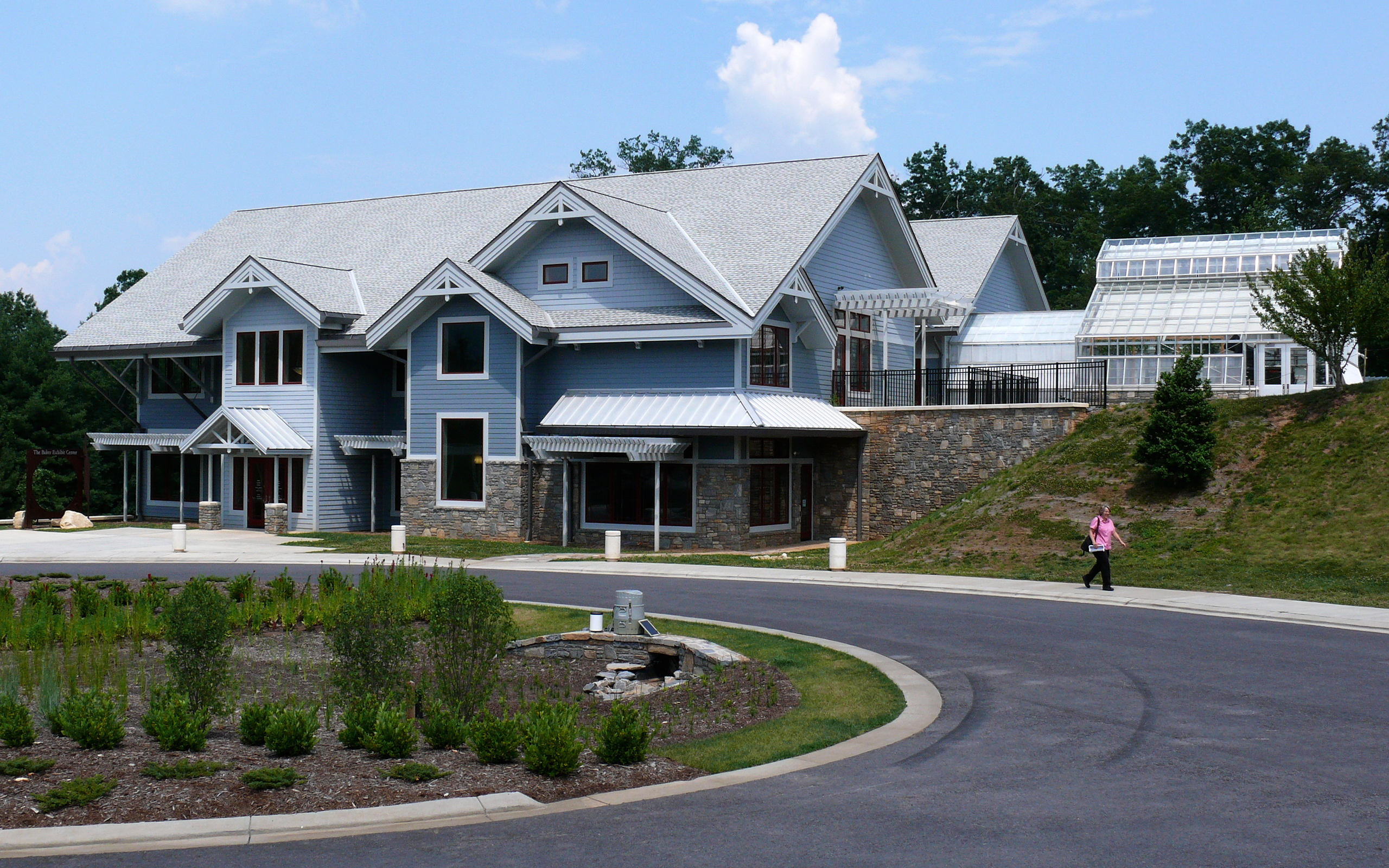
- Baker Exhibit Center
- Interactive map of North Carolina Arboretum
- Type: Arboretum, Botanical garden
- Area: 434 acres (176 ha)
- Website: www.ncarboretum.org

The North Carolina Arboretum (434 acres (176 ha)) is an arboretum and botanical garden located within the Bent Creek Experimental Forest of the Pisgah National Forest at 20 Frederick Law Olmsted Way, southwest of Asheville, North Carolina near the Blue Ridge Parkway. It is open daily except for Christmas Day. There is no admission charge, but some parking fees do apply.

Although the idea for the arboretum stretches back to landscape architect Frederick Law Olmsted in 1898, who wished to create an arboretum at the nearby Biltmore Estate, today's arboretum was established by the General Assembly in 1986, as a facility of the University of North Carolina. In 1989 the site was officially designated the North Carolina Arboretum.

The arboretum is still under active development. It includes many hiking and bicycling trails, a bonsai collection, a holly garden, and a stream garden. Its tree collection includes a fine set of Metasequoias planted in 1950, and now said to be the tallest in the south (over 100 feet (30 m) in height). In 2016, a certification from Bee Campus USA recognized the arboretum's efforts to teach about and support pollinators.

== Gardens ==
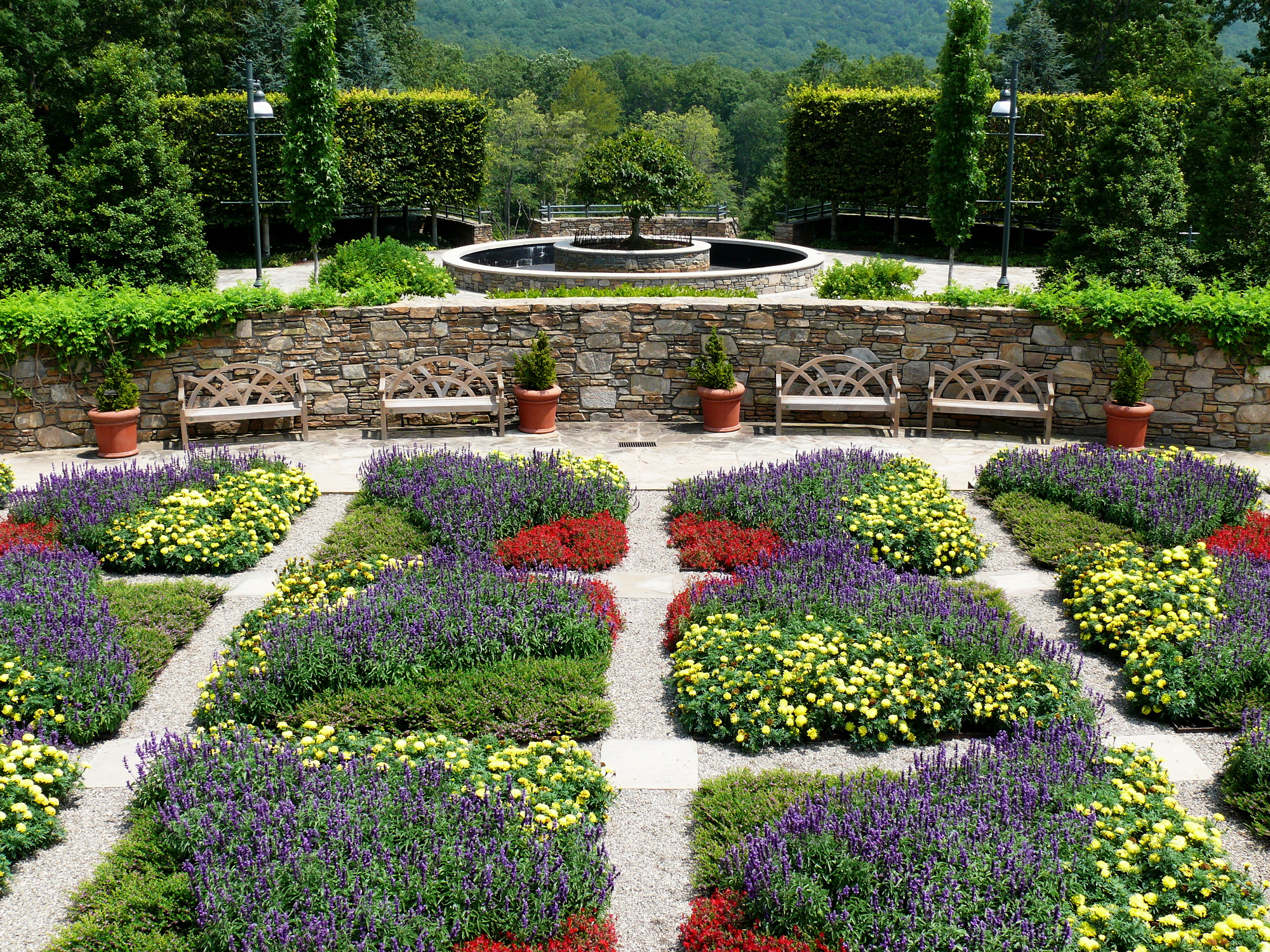
Blue Ridge Quilt Garden

- Blue Ridge Quilt Garden - parterre reflecting quilt designs of the Blue Ridge Mountains.
- Cliff Dickinson Holly Garden - a variety of American and non-native hollies.
- French Broad River Watershed Training Center - Educational programs relating to streambanks and waterways, pasture management, stormwater runoff, and erosion control.
- Heritage Garden - a demonstration garden for plants used in traditional Western North Carolina crafts, including dye-making, basketry, paper-making, and broom-making.
- National Native Azalea Repository - a streamside garden representing almost every azalea species native to the United States, with cultivated varieties and hybrids. This repository is part of the North American Plant Collections Consortium.
- Plant Professional Landscape Garden (2 acres) - a study, training, and testing site that contains 250+ ornamental plants from the Certified Plant Professional exam.
- Plants of Promise Garden - residential demonstration gardens that include plants being evaluated for the Southern Appalachian region.
- Stream Garden - a formal setting of trees, shrubs and perennials.
- Support Facility Perennial Border - perennial flowers.
- Garden Railway

== Bonsai collection ==
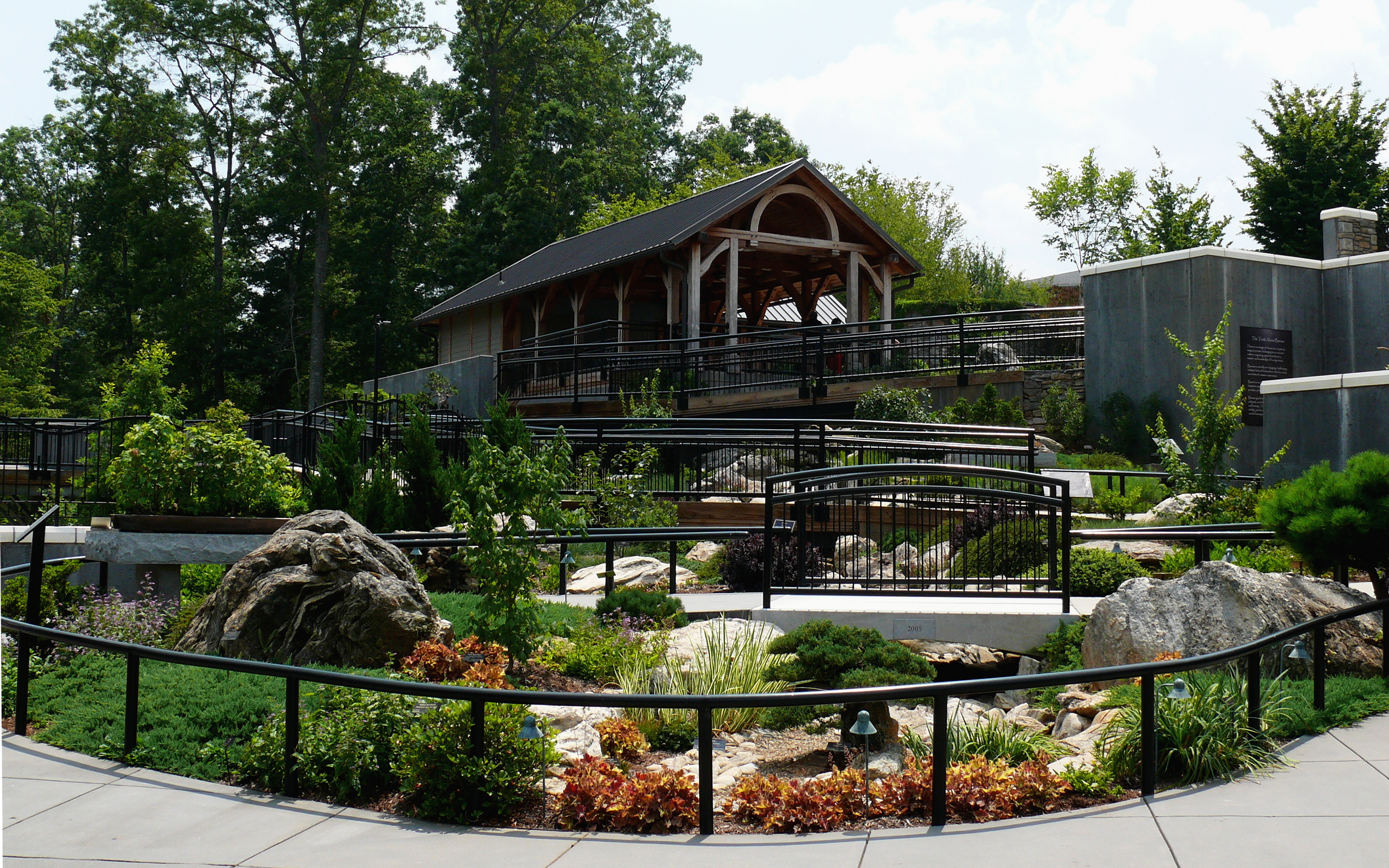
Bonsai Garden

The arboretum's bonsai collection was established in 1992 with the donation of a large number of plants and containers from Mr. and Mrs. George Staples. Curated by Arthur Joura, the collection includes approximately 100 display specimens, including traditional Asian trees such as Japanese maple and Chinese elm; tropical plants such as willow leaf fig; and American species such as bald cypress and limber pine. The collection draws upon traditional roots of bonsai as well as features of a contemporary, Appalachian garden.

== See also ==
- List of botanical gardens in the United States
