= Tucson Botanical Gardens =

Collection of residentially scaled urban gardens in Tucson, Arizona

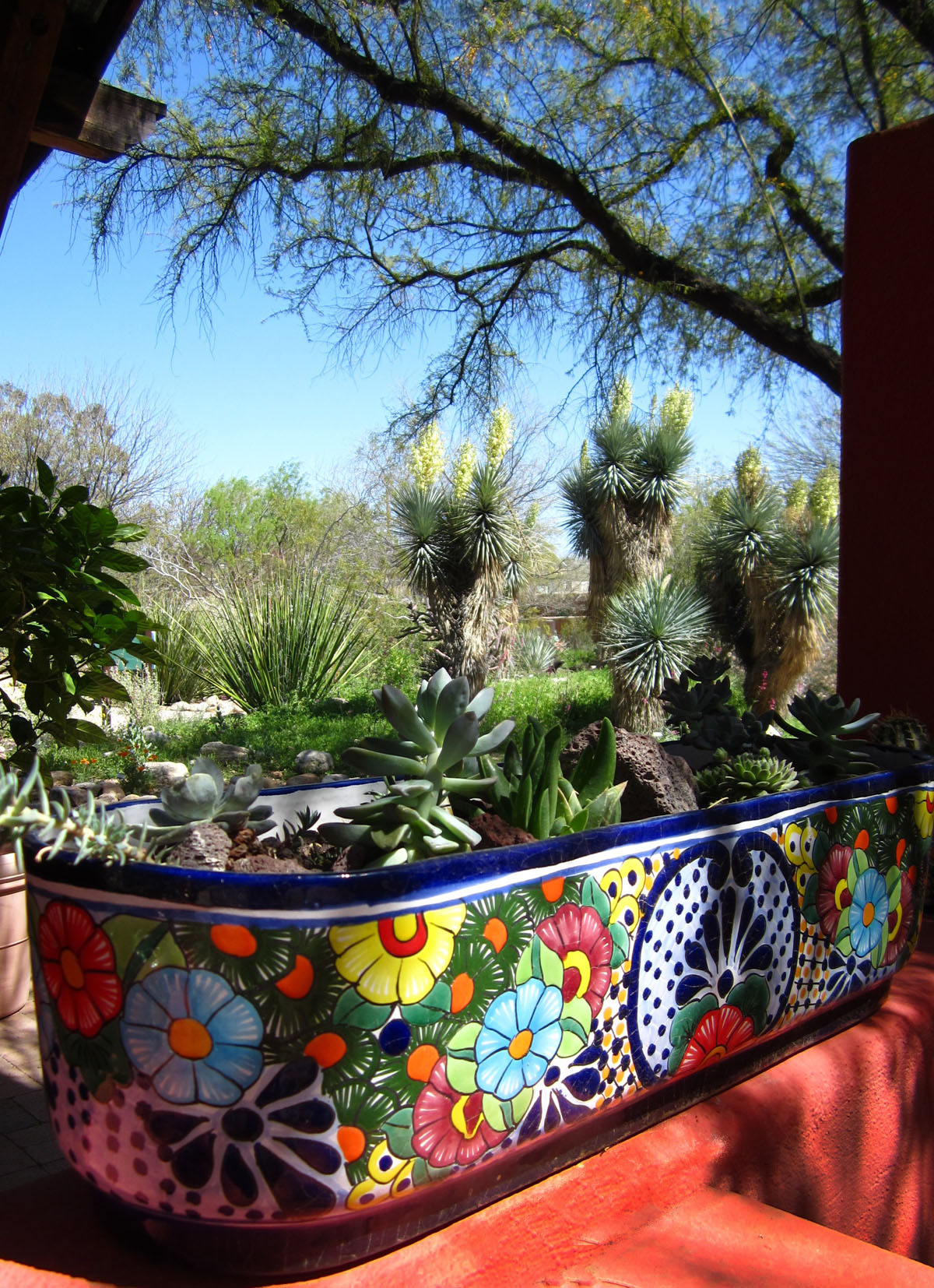
- Interactive map of Tucson Botanical Gardens
- Website: tucsonbotanical.org

The Tucson Botanical Gardens (TBG) is a 5.5 acre (2.2 ha) collection of 20 gardens in the heart of Tucson, Arizona, United States. TBG was selected as number four in USA Today's 10best Readers' Choice awards for Best Botanical Garden in 2025. The gardens include the Cactus and Succulent Garden, Barrio Garden, Children's Garden, Herb Garden and many more showing the diversity of plants that can thrive in the Sonoran Desert. There are tropical butterflies from around the world that are featured in the Cox Butterfly and Orchid Pavilion from October–May. In addition to the 20 Gardens there are also rotating art displays, community classes, events and international exhibits.

== History ==
The house was originally the longtime home of Rutger and Bernice Porter. The Porters raised a family, ran a nursery, and participated fully in the life of Tucson. Tucson at that time was an up-and-coming town of about 35,000 people. The earliest buildings on the grounds date to the 1920s and were constructed of adobe bricks made on site. As the Porter family expanded their home did as well, resulting in three bedrooms, two baths, a sleeping porch, and several beautifully landscaped patios and gardens. The Porters’ garden developed from many planting experiments with a mixture of natives and Mediterranean plants. Over the years, the original garden began to reflect the sturdier choices for the Tucson climate.

Today, the Historical Garden contains many of the original plants from Porter estate including citrus, roses, privet, sweet olive, nandina, pomegranate, Aleppo pine, pyrancantha, iris, chaste-tree, jasmine and other plants of that era. The oasis style represented in this garden is typical of large Tucson gardens dating from the 1920s to the mid-1960s. Bernice wanted the beloved property to become a public garden and donated it to the City of Tucson in 1968 while continuing to live in a small apartment on the grounds. In 1974, the Tucson City Council passed Resolution 9384 which stated that the property would be used for the development of a botanical garden to serve as a horticultural center, a sanctuary for wild birds, and as a center for education.

Since it became open to the public, the Tucson Botanical Gardens has renovated and expanded the property while preserving the Porter Family legacy as an important piece of Tucson history. The organization has also expanded its offerings over time by continuing to provide educational resources to the community as well as developing several public events held throughout the year. The 1990s were a period of rapid growth for the Gardens, evidenced by the additions of an outdoor amphitheater, compost demonstration area, Butterfly Garden and several multicultural exhibits. A new educational building was constructed in 2000 and the popular Butterfly Magic exhibit began in 2004.

In recent years, Tucson Botanical Gardens has increased its commitment to bringing nationally recognized exhibits to Tucson. Beginning in 2015 with the traveling exhibit, Nature Connects, and continuing with hosting the New York Botanical Gardens show, Frida Kahlo: Art, Garden, Life, the Gardens have seen an increased number of visitors, membership and volunteer participation. In 2019 a 25-year master plan was completed by landscape architect and public garden master planner, Cindy Tyler of Terra Design Studio, LLC. The plan includes purchasing surrounding properties to expand the area of the Gardens, the addition of a new Butterfly & Orchid Pavilion and Event Center, as well as a new 2 acre Children and Family Garden and Education Center.

== Gallery ==
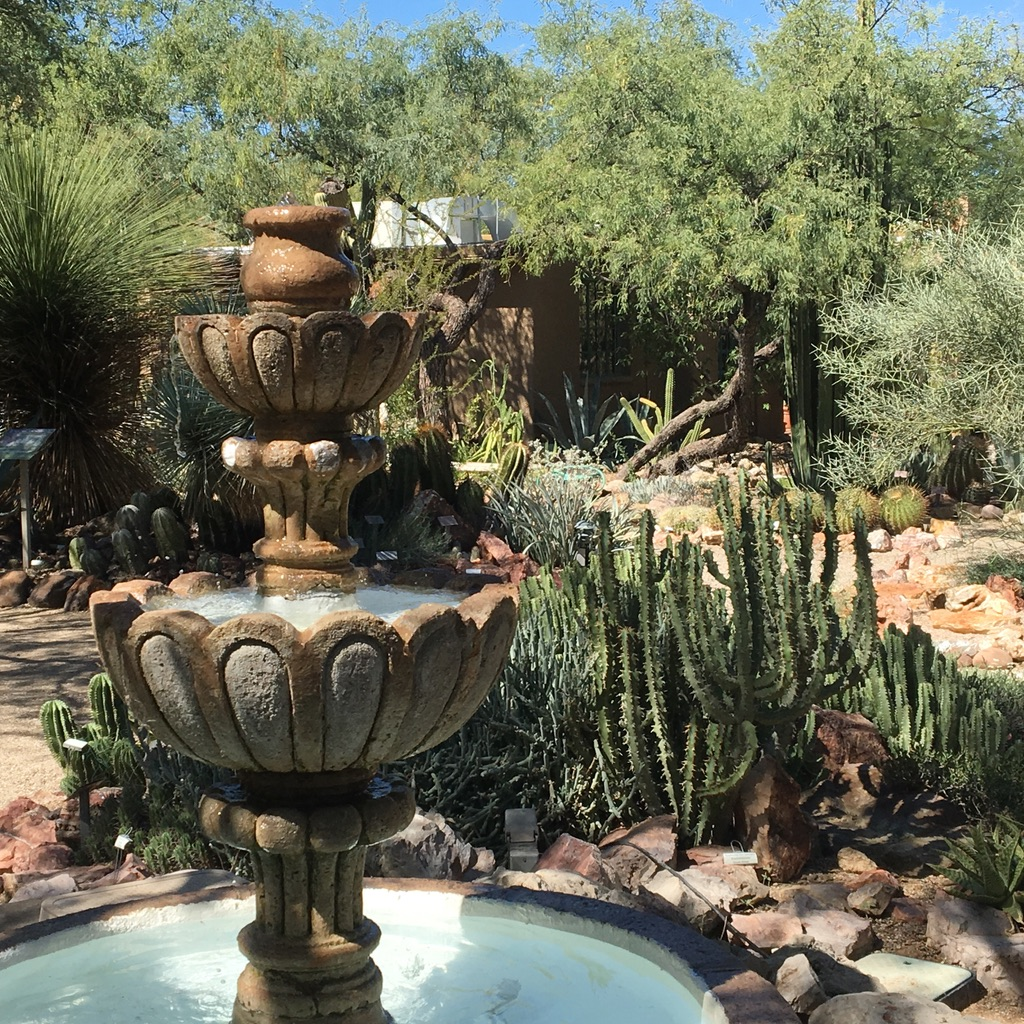

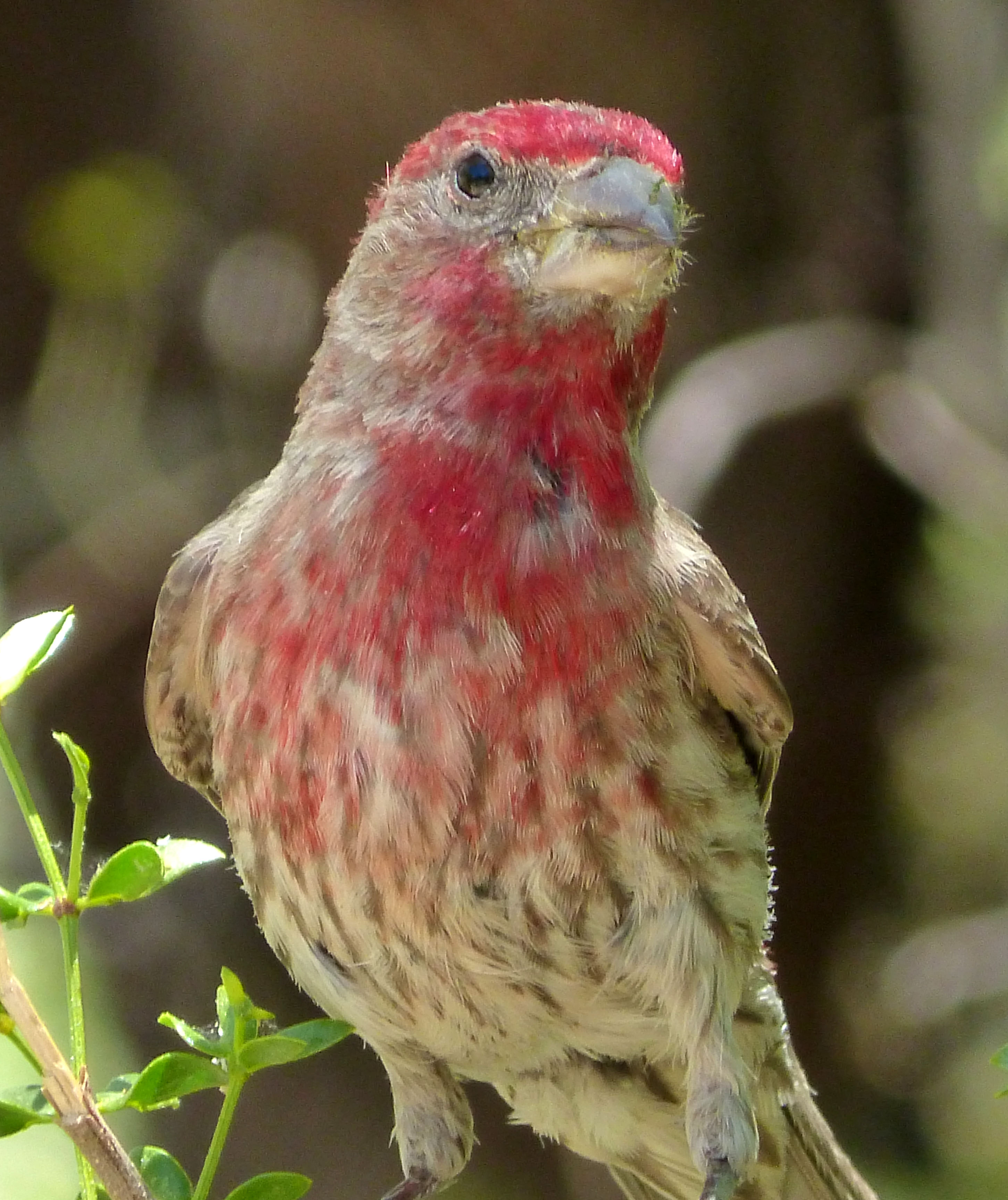

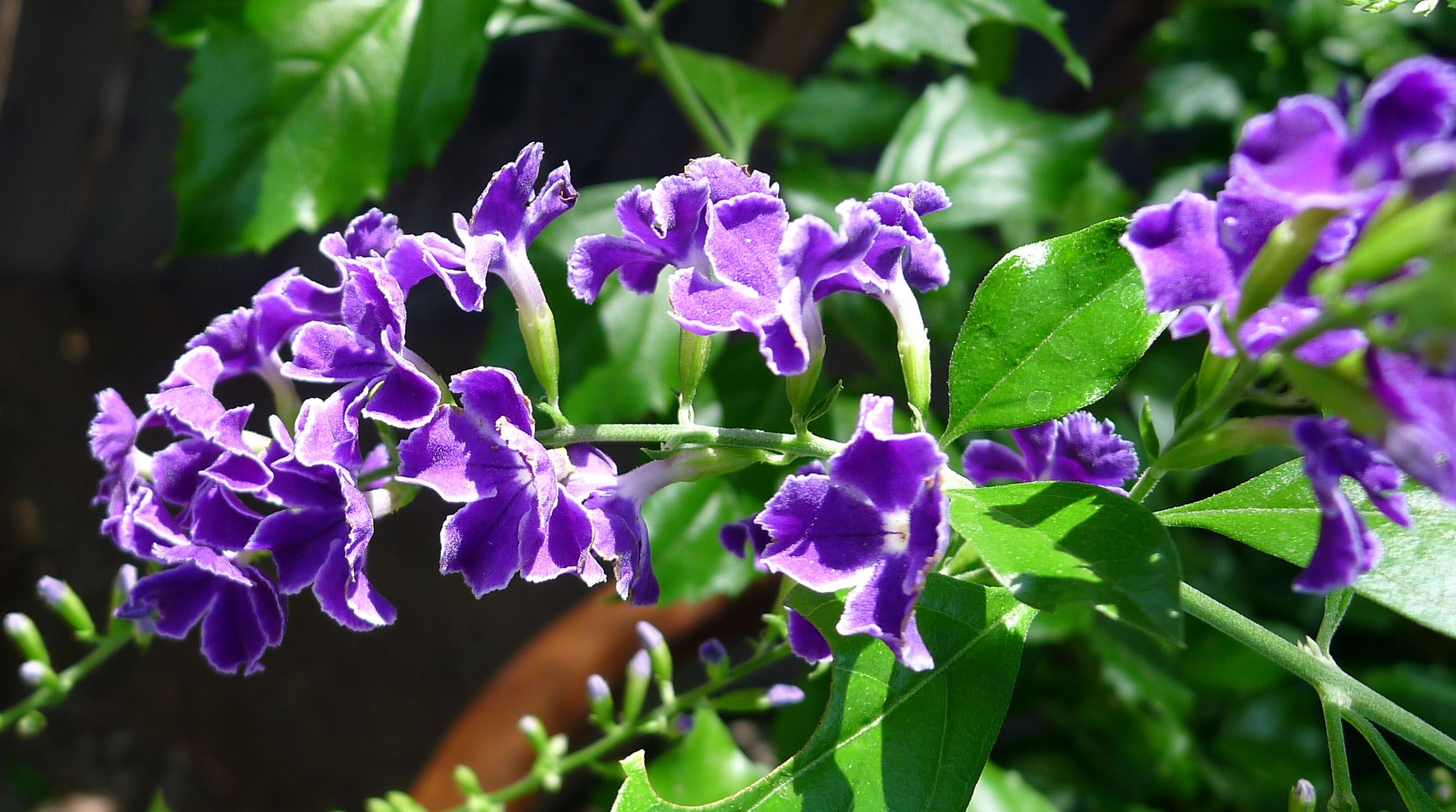

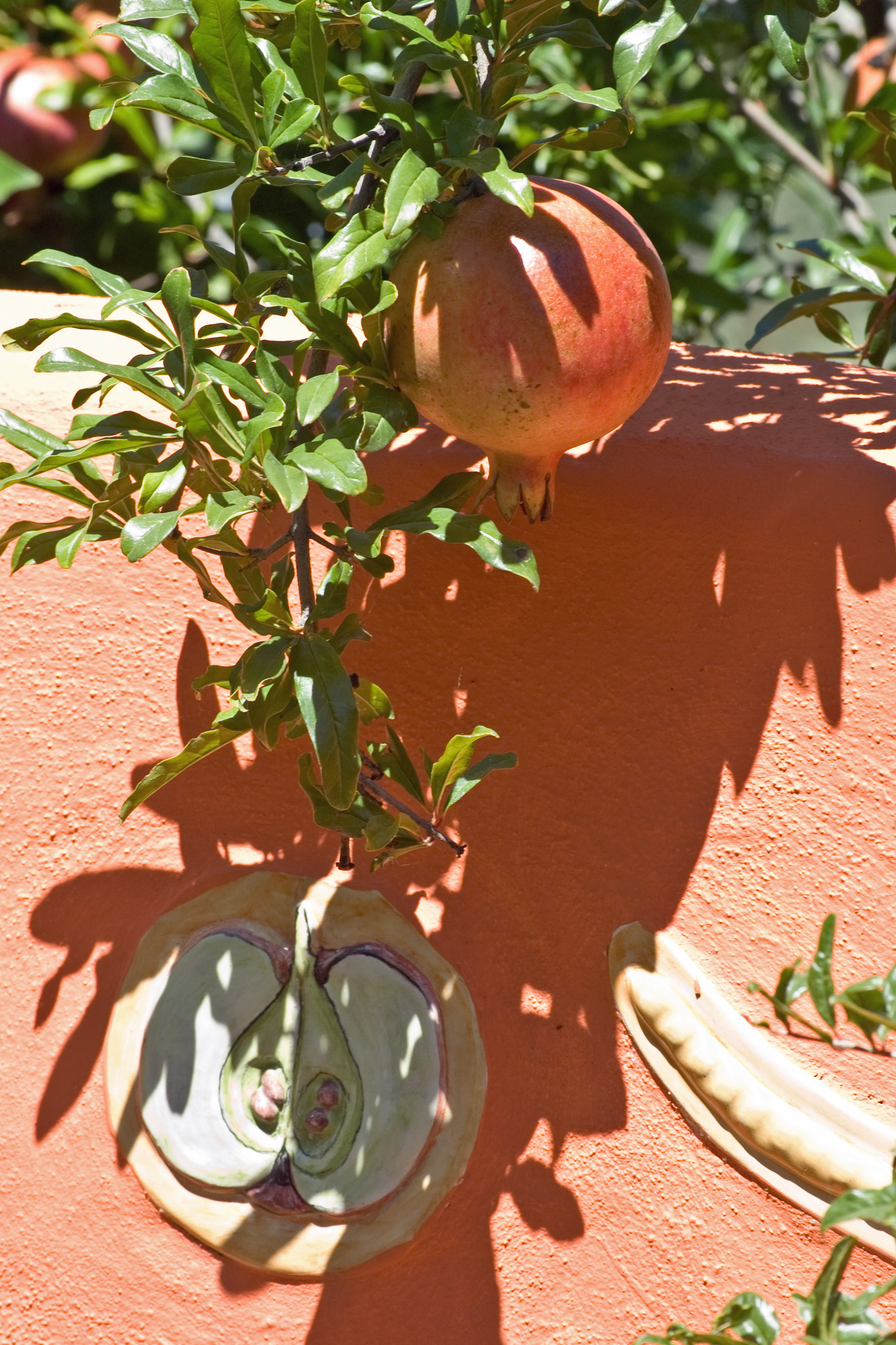

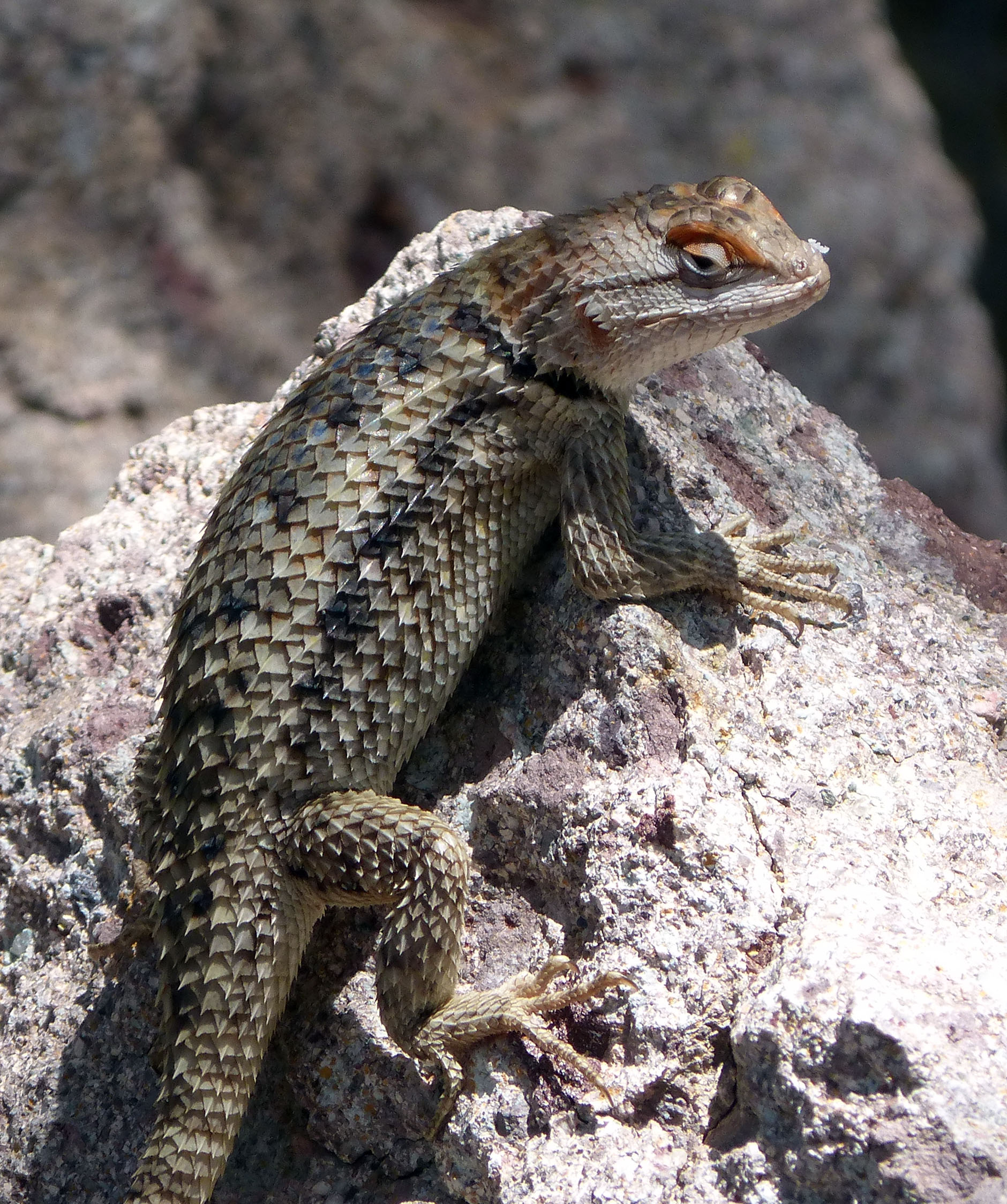

== See also ==
- List of botanical gardens and arboretums in Arizona
