= The Arboretum at Flagstaff =

Arboretum in Coconino County, Arizona

Coordinates: 35°9′37″N 111°43′53″W

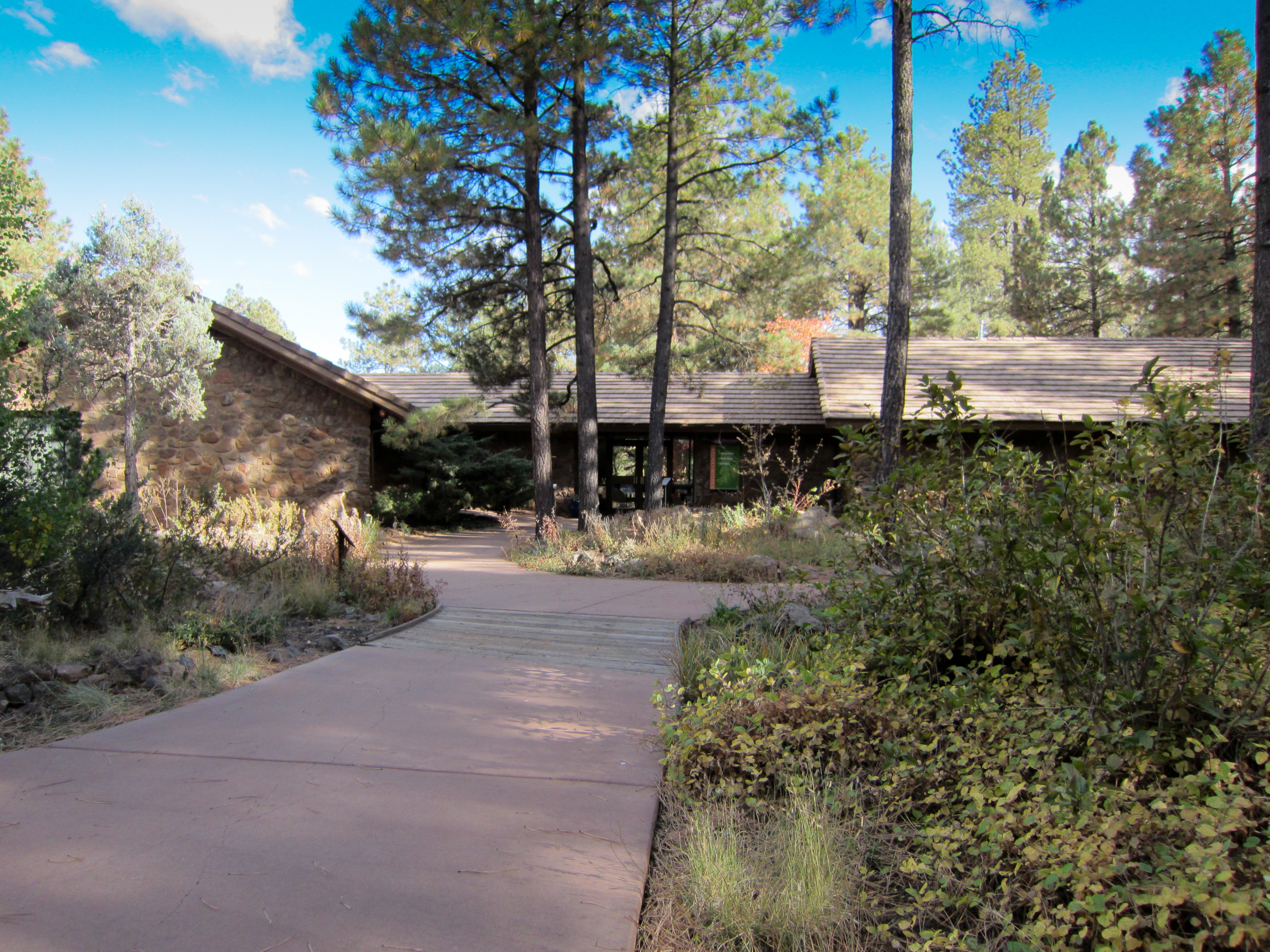
The Arboretum at Flagstaff located in Flagstaff, Arizona, US

The Arboretum at Flagstaff is a 200-acre (81 ha) arboretum that is home to 750 species of mostly drought-tolerant adapted and native plants representative of the high-desert Colorado Plateau, home to the Grand Canyon and Zion National Park. It is located 3.8 miles (6.1 km) south of U.S. Route 66 on Woody Mountain Road, on the west side of Flagstaff, Arizona, US. The facility is located at 7,150' in elevation, making it one of the highest-elevation public gardens in the United States. The Arboretum has an extensive regional collection of the Penstemon genus.

The Arboretum was originally forest and a working ranch, and the home of Frances McAllister in the late 1960s. She donated the land and created its financial endowment for the Arboretum in 1981. To support research the Arboretum is also home to the Merriam-Powell Research Station and Southwest Experimental Garden Array.

== Climate ==
Flagstaff 4 SW is a weather station near The Arboretum. Flagstaff 4 SW has a dry-summer humid continental climate (Köppen Dsb) and is within the 5b USDA Hardiness Zone, with an average annual extreme minimum temperature of -13.8 °F (25.4 °C).

Climate data for Flagstaff 4 SW, Arizona, 1991–2020 normals, 1984-2020 extremes: 7125ft (2172m)
Month	Jan	Feb	Mar	Apr	May	Jun	Jul	Aug	Sep	Oct	Nov	Dec	Year
Record high °F (°C)	63 (17)	70 (21)	73 (23)	80 (27)	87 (31)	94 (34)	96 (36)	93 (34)	91 (33)	81 (27)	73 (23)	66 (19)	96 (36)
Mean maximum °F (°C)	56.7 (13.7)	58.7 (14.8)	64.8 (18.2)	71.8 (22.1)	78.9 (26.1)	87.6 (30.9)	90.1 (32.3)	86.8 (30.4)	82.4 (28.0)	75.7 (24.3)	66.5 (19.2)	58.6 (14.8)	91.0 (32.8)
Mean daily maximum °F (°C)	43.9 (6.6)	45.8 (7.7)	51.9 (11.1)	58.6 (14.8)	67.2 (19.6)	78.0 (25.6)	81.6 (27.6)	78.9 (26.1)	73.8 (23.2)	63.8 (17.7)	52.6 (11.4)	43.6 (6.4)	61.6 (16.5)
Daily mean °F (°C)	28.4 (−2.0)	31.0 (−0.6)	36.2 (2.3)	41.9 (5.5)	48.6 (9.2)	57.3 (14.1)	64.2 (17.9)	62.8 (17.1)	56.1 (13.4)	45.9 (7.7)	35.7 (2.1)	28.1 (−2.2)	44.7 (7.0)
Mean daily minimum °F (°C)	12.9 (−10.6)	16.1 (−8.8)	20.5 (−6.4)	25.2 (−3.8)	30.1 (−1.1)	36.5 (2.5)	46.9 (8.3)	46.6 (8.1)	38.4 (3.6)	27.9 (−2.3)	18.8 (−7.3)	12.6 (−10.8)	27.7 (−2.4)
Mean minimum °F (°C)	−10.0 (−23.3)	−4.8 (−20.4)	1.0 (−17.2)	10.8 (−11.8)	17.9 (−7.8)	24.9 (−3.9)	34.7 (1.5)	36.4 (2.4)	25.4 (−3.7)	14.0 (−10.0)	1.9 (−16.7)	−7.9 (−22.2)	−13.8 (−25.4)
Record low °F (°C)	−28 (−33)	−37 (−38)	−18 (−28)	−4 (−20)	8 (−13)	17 (−8)	25 (−4)	26 (−3)	18 (−8)	−4 (−20)	−19 (−28)	−36 (−38)	−37 (−38)
Average precipitation inches (mm)	2.07 (53)	2.50 (64)	2.28 (58)	1.00 (25)	0.82 (21)	0.37 (9.4)	2.72 (69)	3.30 (84)	1.95 (50)	1.76 (45)	1.48 (38)	2.24 (57)	22.49 (573.4)
Average snowfall inches (cm)	16.70 (42.4)	12.80 (32.5)	13.60 (34.5)	4.70 (11.9)	0.50 (1.3)	0.00 (0.00)	0.00 (0.00)	0.00 (0.00)	0.00 (0.00)	1.40 (3.6)	5.80 (14.7)	9.80 (24.9)	65.3 (165.8)
Source 1: NOAA
Source 2: XMACIS2 (records & monthly max/mins)

== See also ==
- List of botanical gardens and arboretums in Arizona
