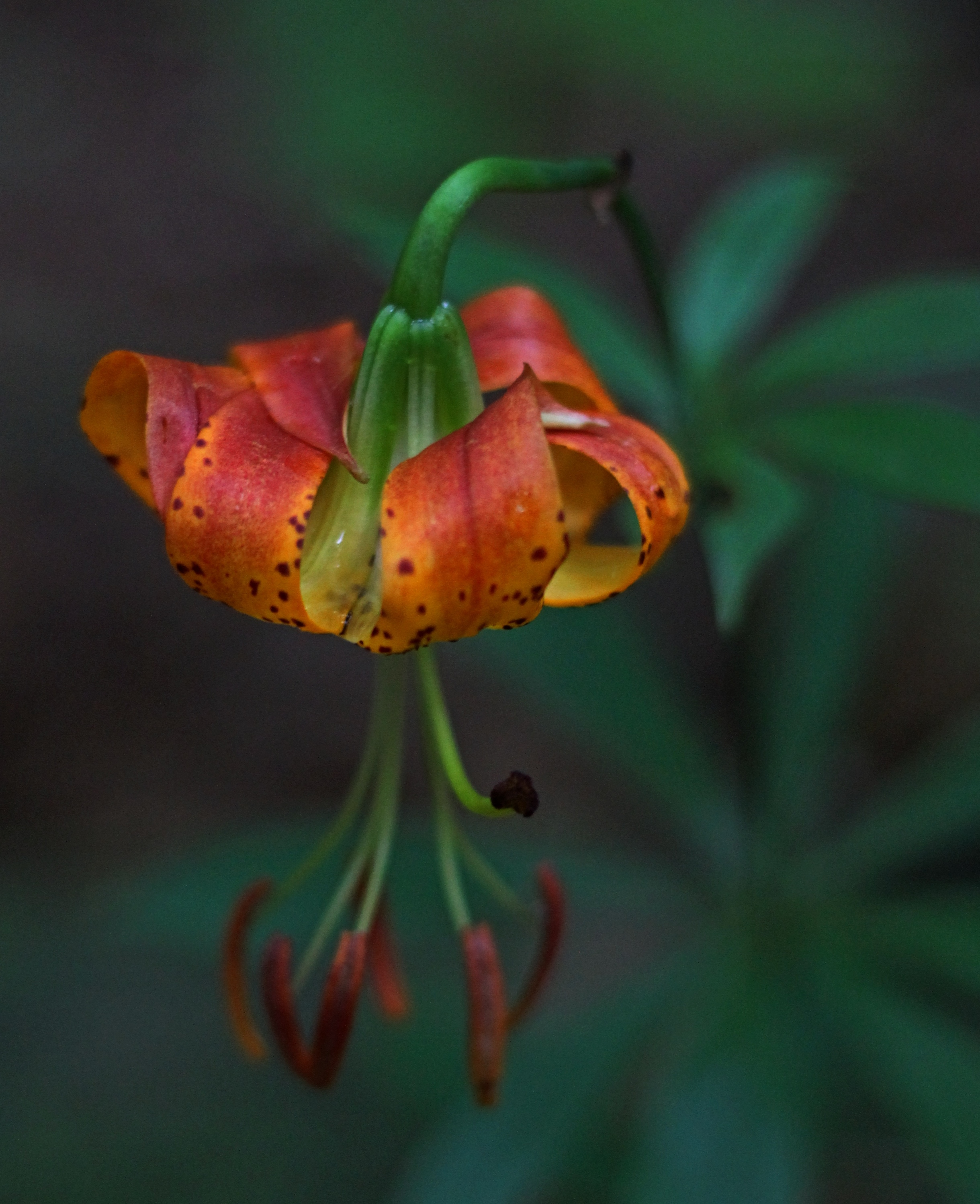
- In the Uwharrie National Forest
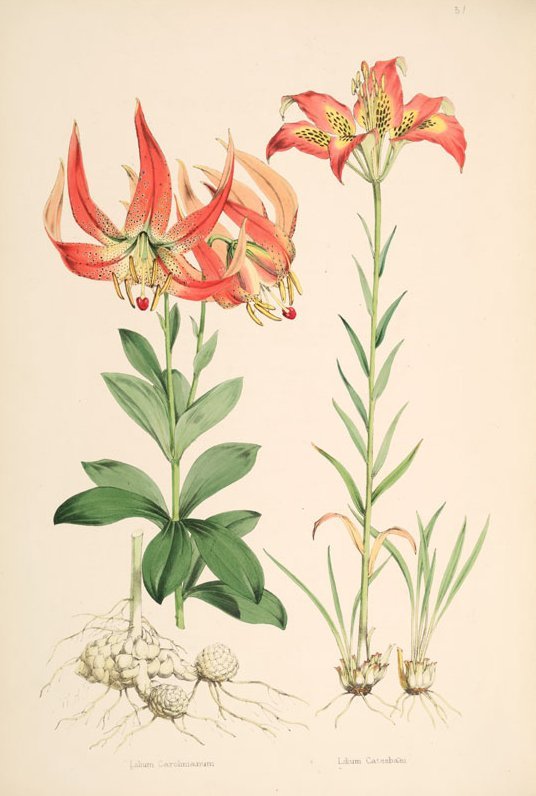
- L. michauxii Poir. [as syn. L. carolinianum Michx.] (left)

Conservation status
- Apparently Secure (NatureServe)

Scientific classification
- Kingdom: Plantae
- Clade: Embryophytes
- Clade: Tracheophytes
- Clade: Spermatophytes
- Clade: Angiosperms
- Clade: Monocots
- Order: Liliales
- Family: Liliaceae
- Subfamily: Lilioideae
- Genus: Lilium
- Species: L. michauxii

Binomial name
- Lilium michauxii Poir.

Synonyms
- 6 Synonyms: Lilium autumnale G.Lodd. (1820); Lilium canadense var. carolinianum (Chapm.) Baker (1871); Lilium carolinianum Michx. (1803); Lilium lockettii Featherm. (1871); Lilium michauxianum Schult. & Schult.f. (1829); Lilium superbum var. carolinianum Chapm. (1860)

= Lilium michauxii =

Species of lily

Lilium michauxii, commonly known as the Carolina lily, can be found in the southeastern United States from southern Virginia in the north to the Florida Panhandle in the south to eastern Texas in the west. Blooming is most common in July and August but can occur as late as October. It was named for the French botanist André Michaux, who traveled and did extensive research throughout the Southeast.

The common name "Carolina lily" reflects an older taxonomy that used the name Lilium carolinianum for both L. michauxii and L. catesbaei. Another common name, Turk's cap lily, has been listed for L. michauxii, although L. superbum (which is very similar in appearance to L. michauxii) shares this common name.

The Carolina lily can grow to 3½ feet tall with flowers 3–4 inches across. It is the only fragrant lily east of the Rocky Mountains. Its petals bend backward and are spotted. Colors range from yellow through orange to red for background petal color and from red through purple to brown for the spots. (Note photo below)

The Carolina lily is the official state wildflower of North Carolina.
