= Casas Adobes Plaza =

Shopping mall in Pima County, Arizona

- Location: Casas Adobes, Arizona
- Coordinates: 32.336°N 110.979°W
- Address: 70751/2 North Oracle Road
- Opened: 1948
- Developer: Silvio "Sam" Nanini
- Manager: Partners Management
- Owner: Shenkarow Group
- Num. of stores: 29
- Floors: 2
- Website: casasadobesplaza.com

Casas Adobes Plaza is an upscale shopping mall located in the southwest corner of North Oracle Road and East Ina Road in Casas Adobes, Arizona (United States), just northwest of Tucson.

The attempted assassination of Representative Gabby Giffords, and the murder of chief judge for the U.S. District Court for Arizona, John Roll on January 8, 2011 occurred just across North Oracle Road from Casas Adobes Plaza at the La Toscana Village.

== History ==
Casas Adobes gets its name from a subdivision built by developer Silvio "Sam" Nanini in the 1950s. Casas Adobes has come refer to the entire unincorporated area of the Northwest that is north of Tucson's city limits and between the towns of Oro Valley and Marana.

Mr. Nanini and his wife, Giaconda, moved to Tucson in 1948 seeking to cure Mrs. Nanini's bronchial asthma. The Nanini's were immigrants from Italy, who first moved to Chicago. Nanini immediately worked to begin an upscale shopping plaza in the remote area northwest of Tucson that today forms the heart of the Casas Adobes community. Beginning in the mid-1950s, Nanini developed three subdivisions on about 300 acres that became the heart of the Casas Adobes community and was considered by many to be Tucson's first suburb. All of the homes were built with adobe, or mud, bricks. Nanini and his son William later built the Tucson National Resort and Country Club and the adjacent million-dollar home subdivision, the Tucson National Estates.

Casas Adobes Plaza was built with the same red-brown adobe brick of their Casas Adobes subdivision, and with the intent to mimic the neighborhood markets of Sam Nanini's hometown in Italy. The area has continued to add subdivisions and today it has nearly 60,000 residents.

== About ==
Casas Adobes Plaza, was designed by a protégé of Swiss architect Josias Joesler in the late 1940s. The plaza features Spanish Colonial architecture.
