= Rincon Heights Historic District =

Historic district in Arizona, United States

Rincon Heights Historic District is a historic place in Tucson, Arizona. It is roughly bounded by 6th Street, Broadway Boulevard, Campbell Avenue, and Fremont Avenue.

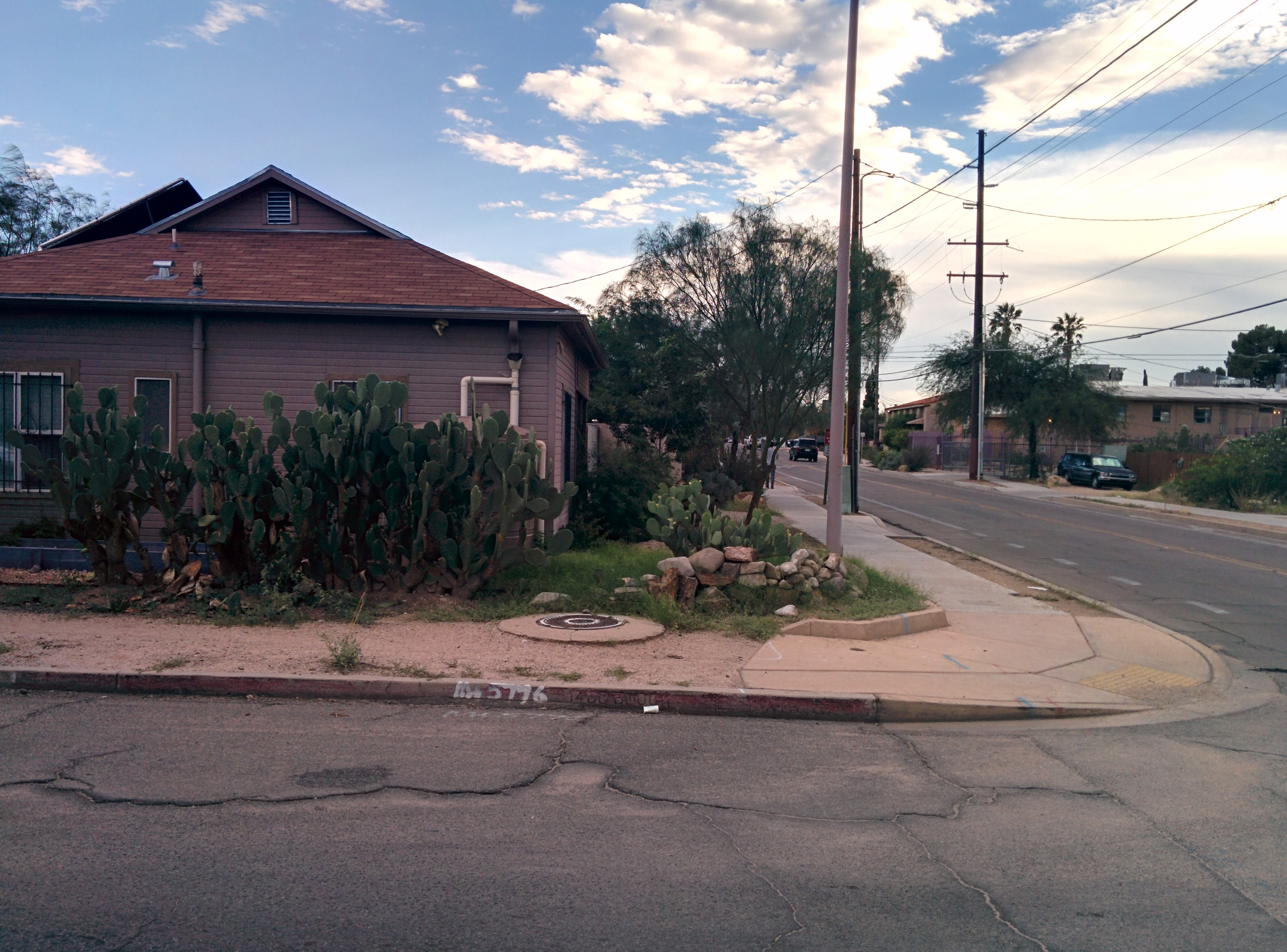
SE corner of 9th St at Highland Ave

Rincon Heights was officially listed as a National Historic District in February 2013. The City funded the preparation of the nomination with a grant it obtained from the State Historic Preservation Office, and the nomination was prepared by Dr. Brooks Jeffery from The University of Arizona and his students, who submitted an application for its official designation as a historic district.

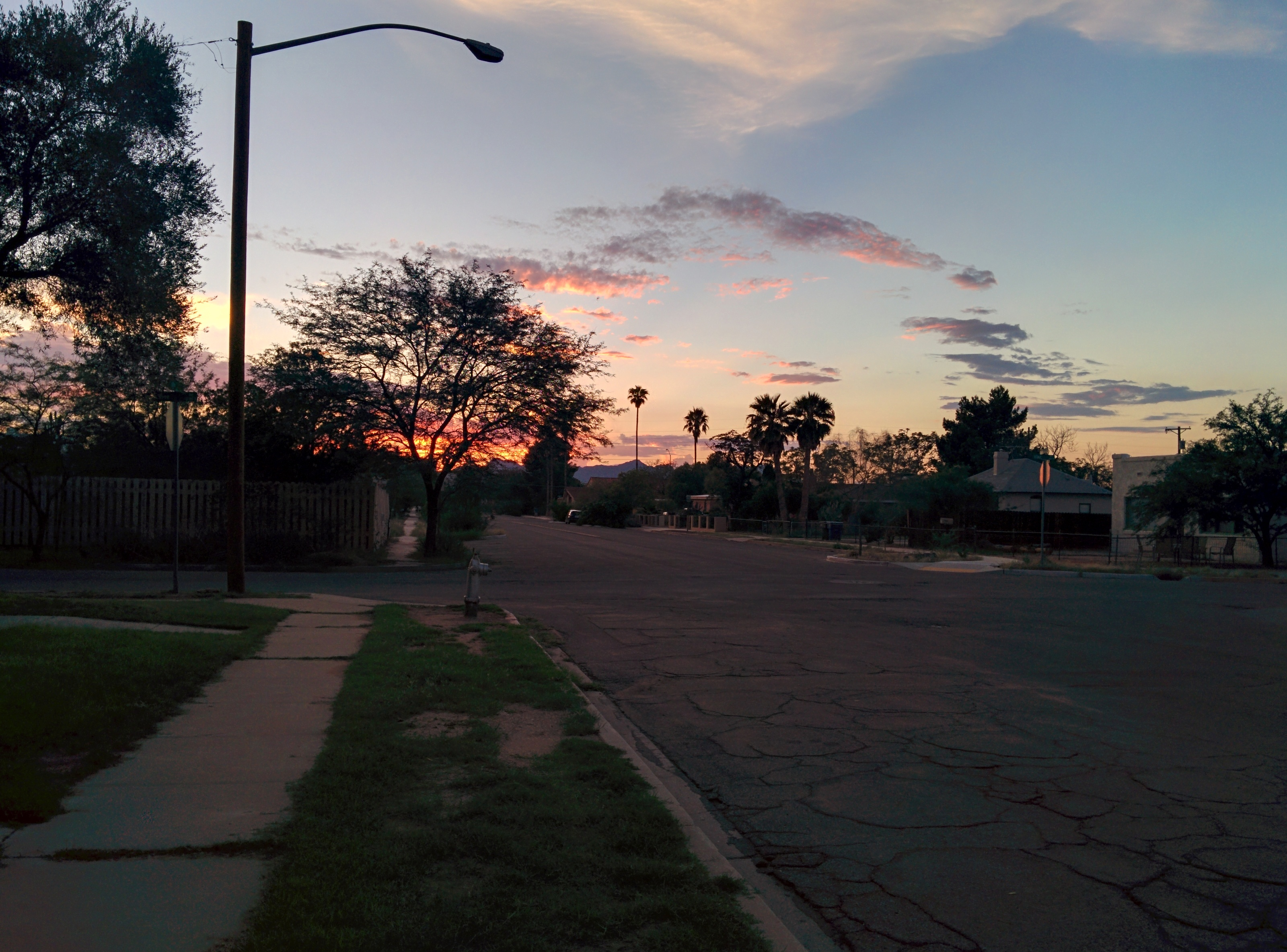
Westbound of 10th St at Vine Ave

== See also ==
- Rattlesnake Bridge
