= Tohono Chul Park =

Arboretum in Tucson, Arizona

Coordinates: 32.3397305°N 110.9812135°W

Tohono Chul
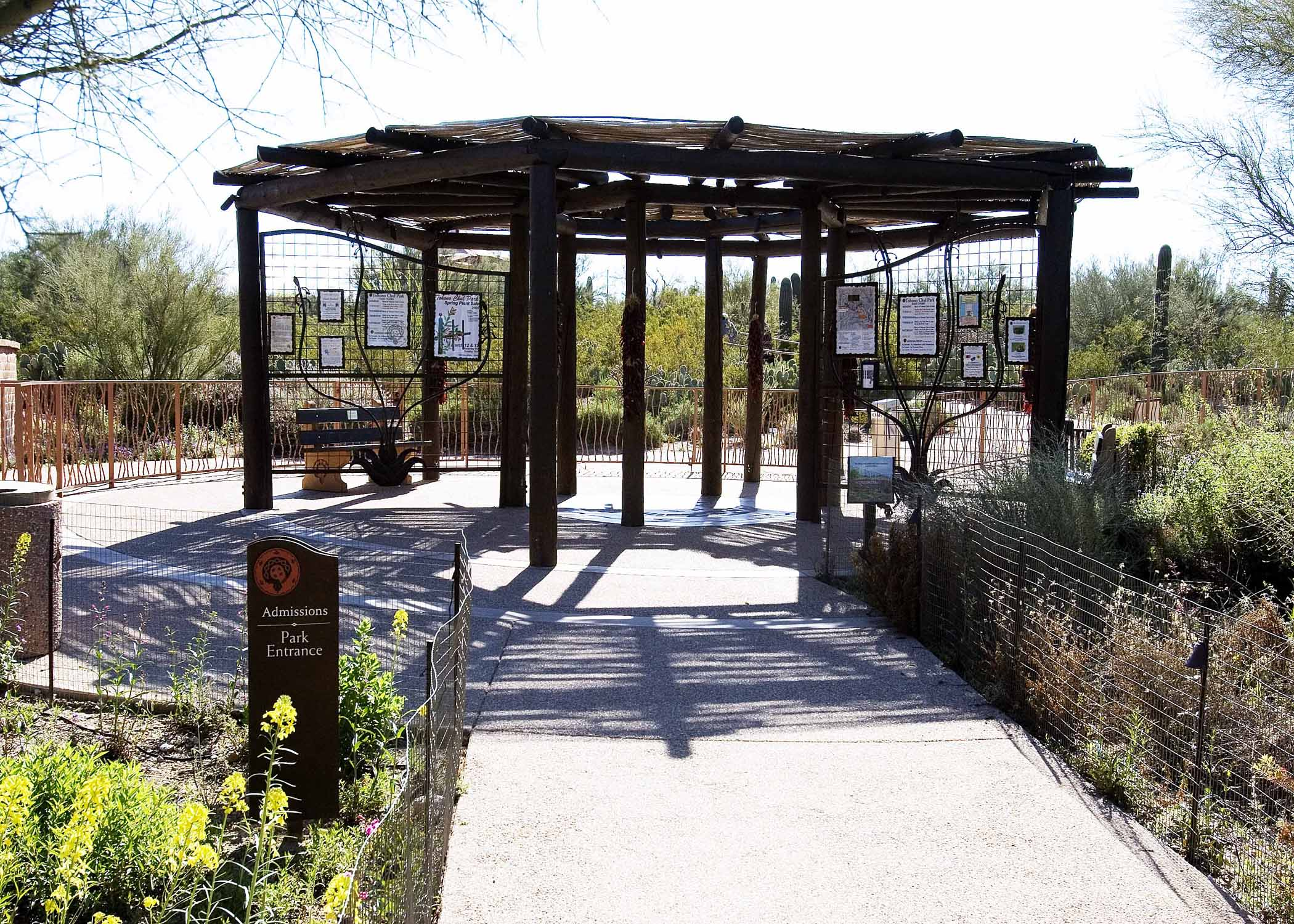
- Entry Ramada
- Interactive map of Tohono Chul
- Type: Botanical Garden and Museum
- Location: Casas Adobes suburb of Tucson, Arizona, United States
- Area: 49 acres (20 ha)
- Created: 1985
- Administrator: private
- Open: everyday except New Year's, July 4th, Thanksgiving, Christmas
- Website: tohonochul.org

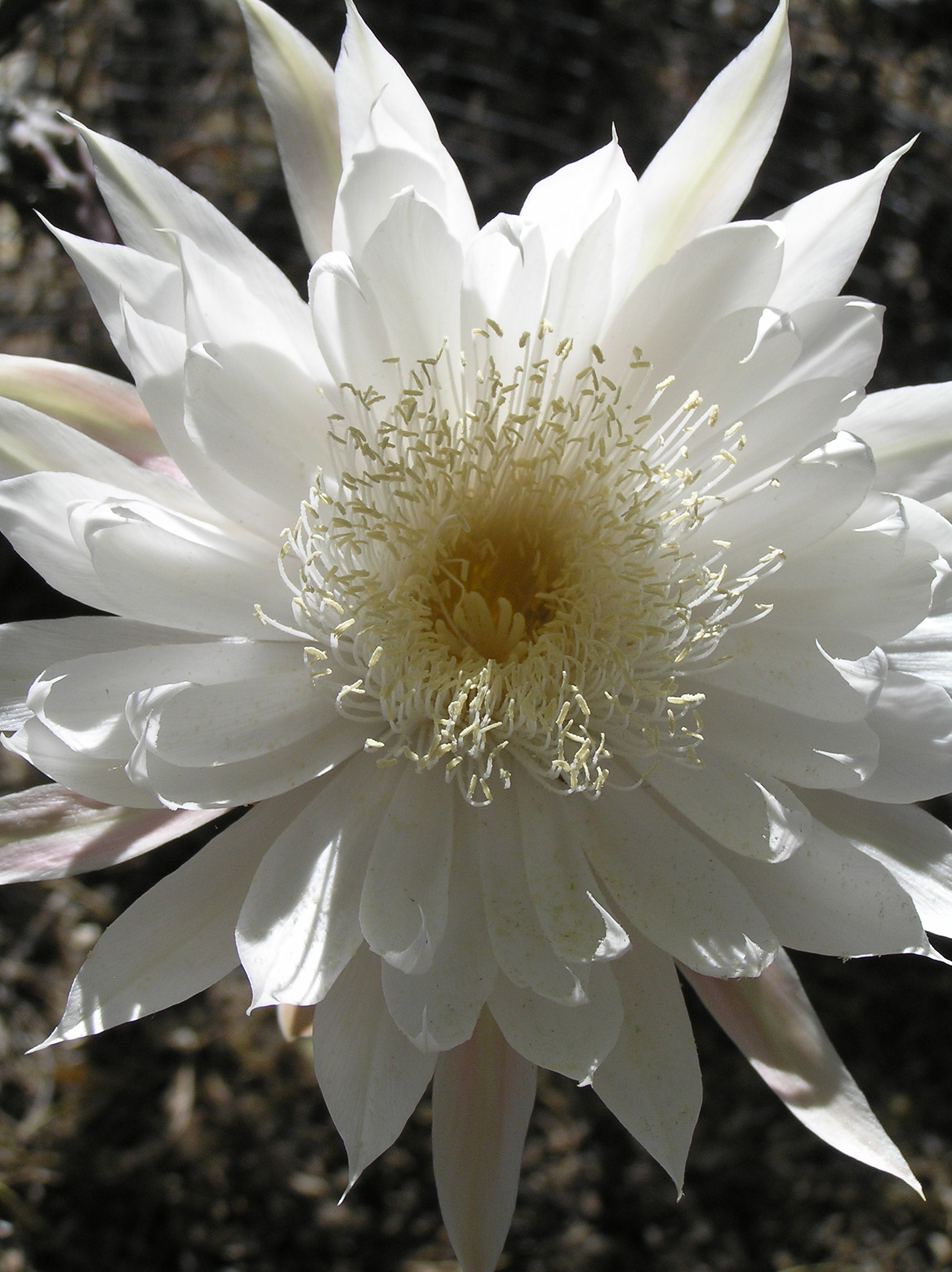
Night-blooming Cereus

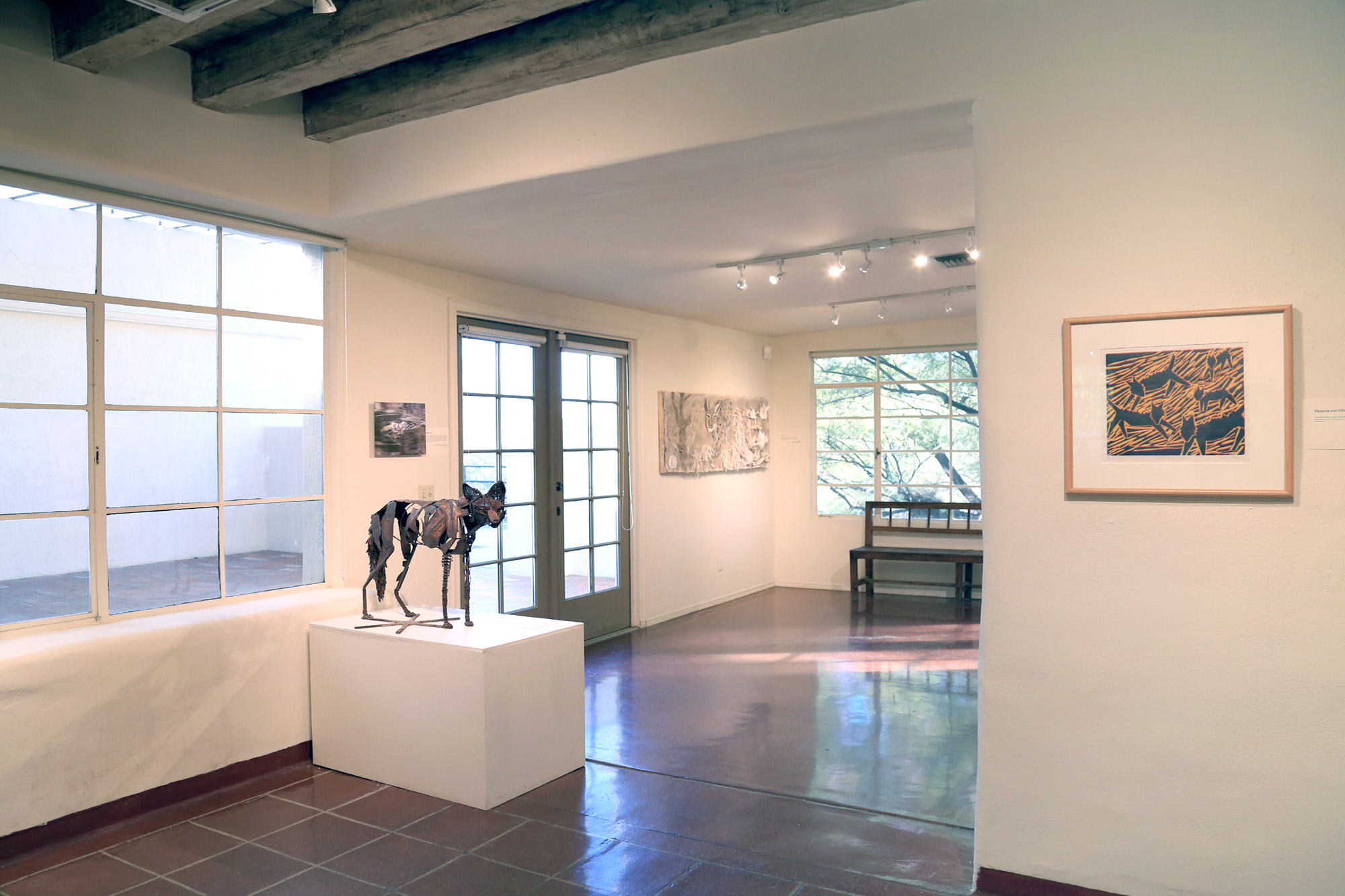
Tohono Chul Park Art Gallery

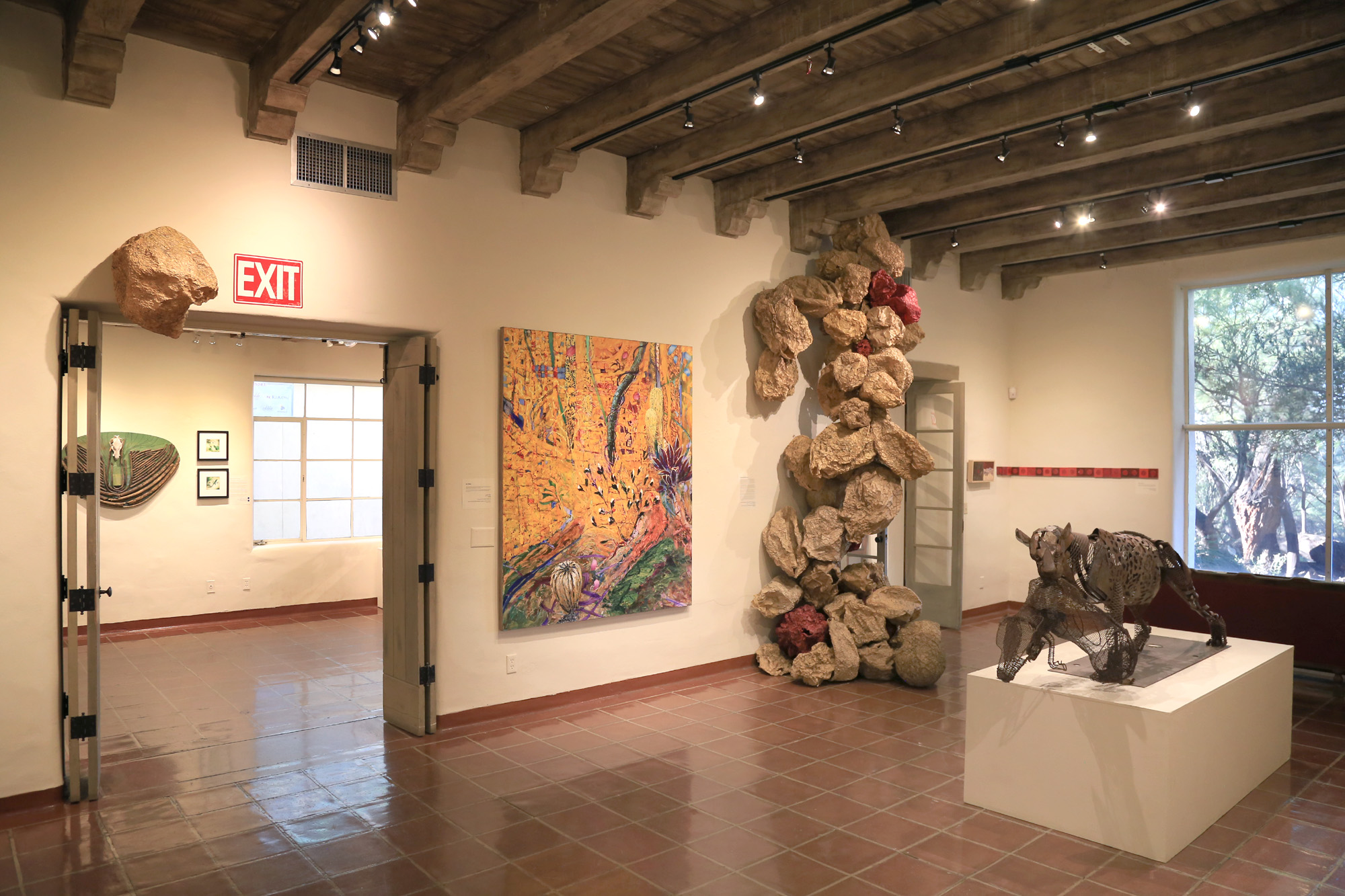
Tohono Chul Park, Art Gallery

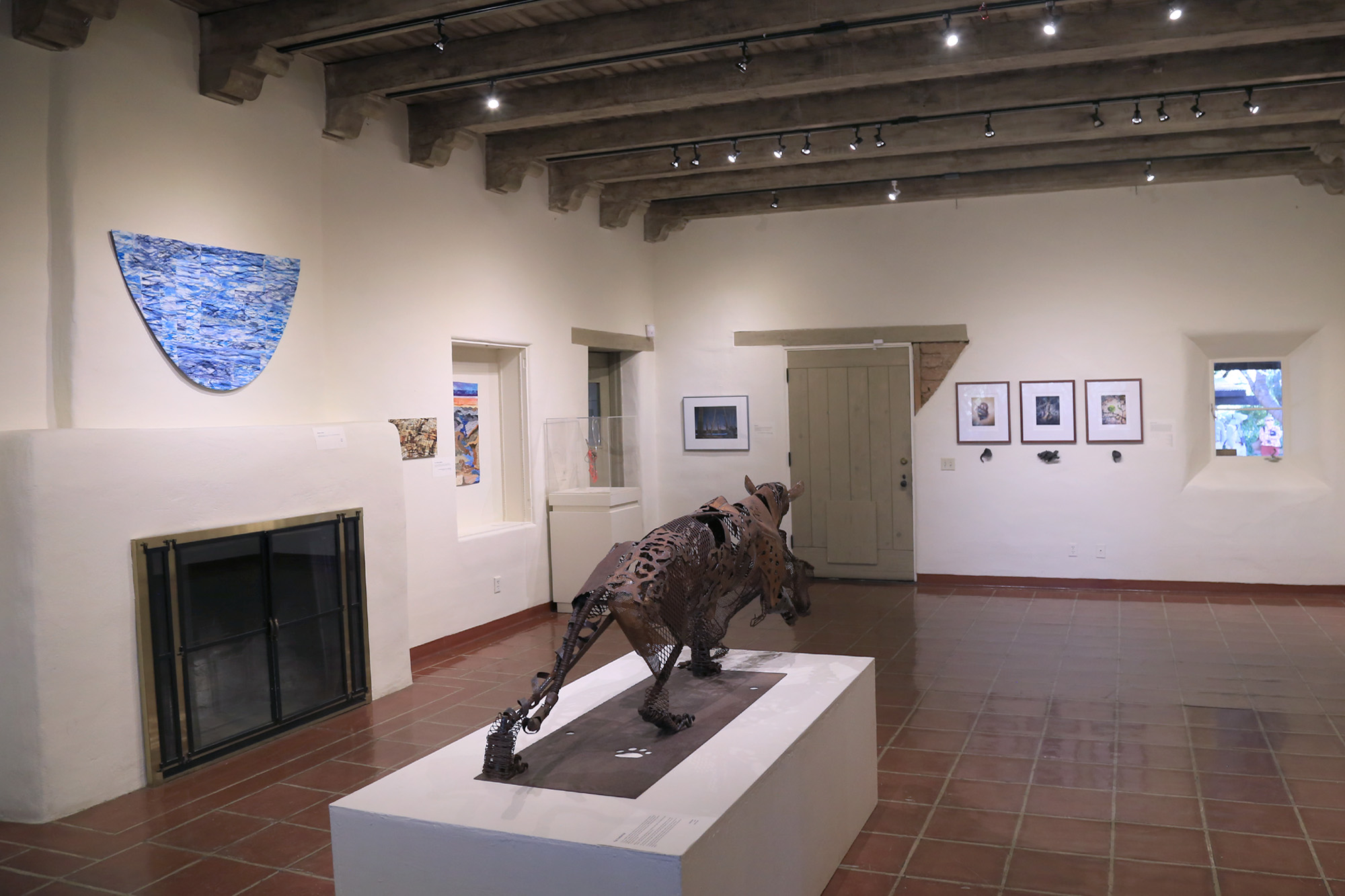
Tohono Chul Park Art Gallery

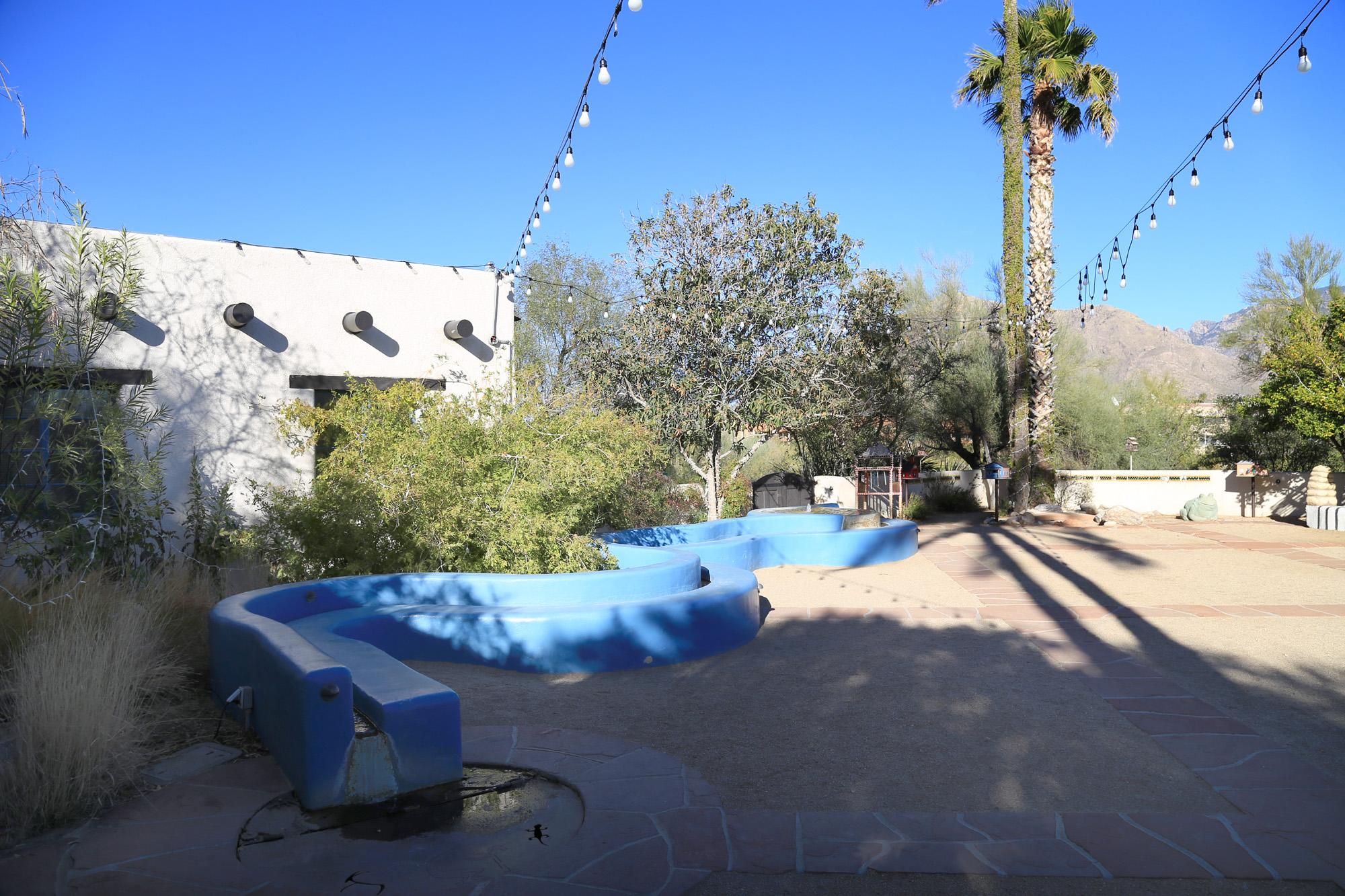
Tohono Chul Park Gardens

Tohono Chul (a.k.a. Tohono Chul Park) is a botanical garden, nature preserve, and cultural museum located in Casas Adobes, a suburb of Tucson, Arizona. The words "tohono chul" translate as "desert corner" and are borrowed from the language of the Tohono O’odham, the indigenous people of southern Arizona. The mission of Tohono Chul is to connect people with the nature, art and culture of the Sonoran Desert region and to "inspir[e] wise stewardship of the natural world".

The 49-acre (19.8 ha) site itself offers a setting for Tohono Chul's regional focus. Overlooking the Santa Catalina Mountains, the park is located in a natural desert habitat within existing migratory tracks of several species of native fauna. Thirty-eight species of birds make their permanent home in the park while another 57 migrant species visit seasonally, and a variety of reptiles and mammals, from Gila monsters to bobcats, may be spotted on the grounds.

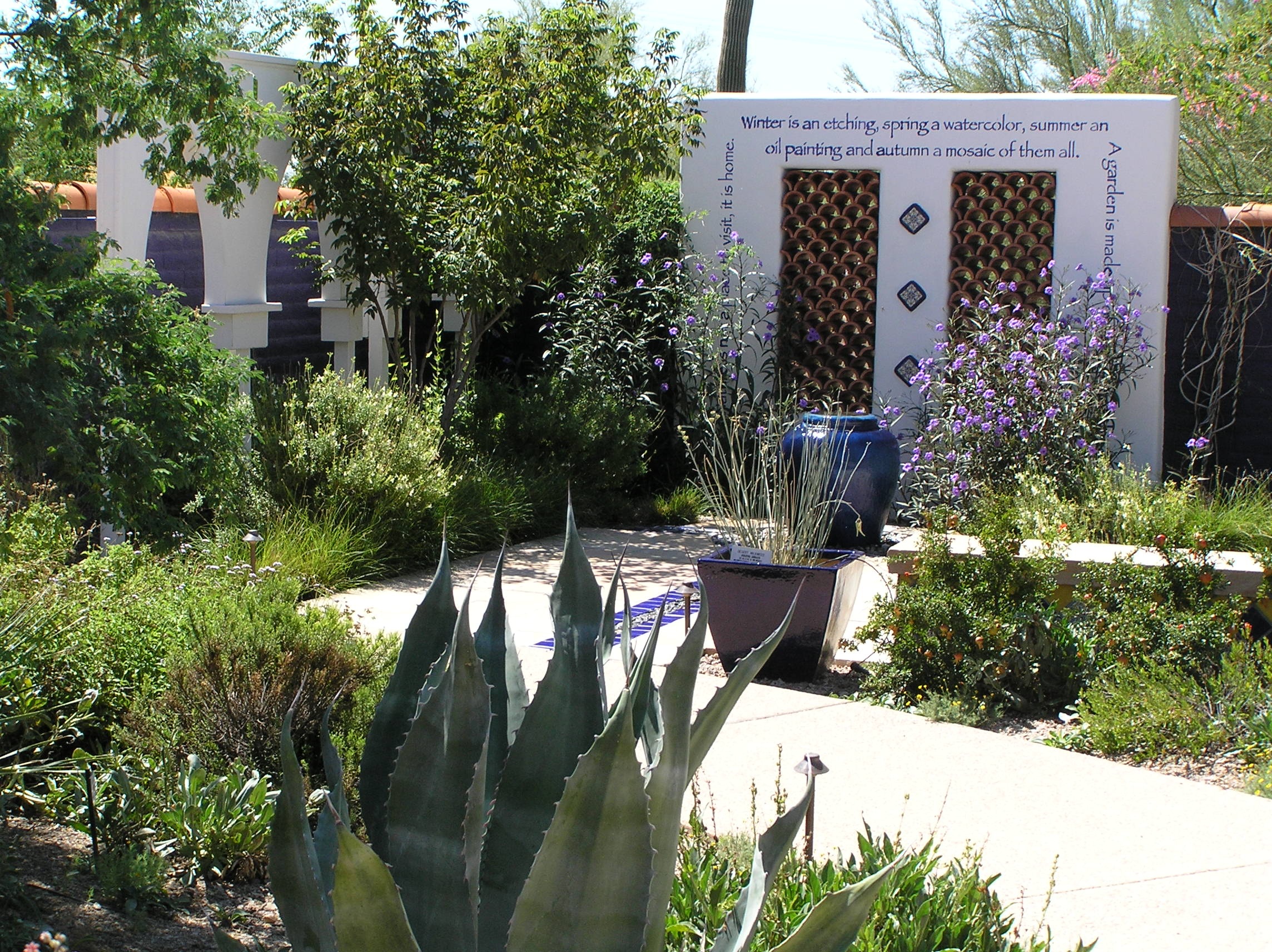
Moorish Garden in the Desert Living Courtyard

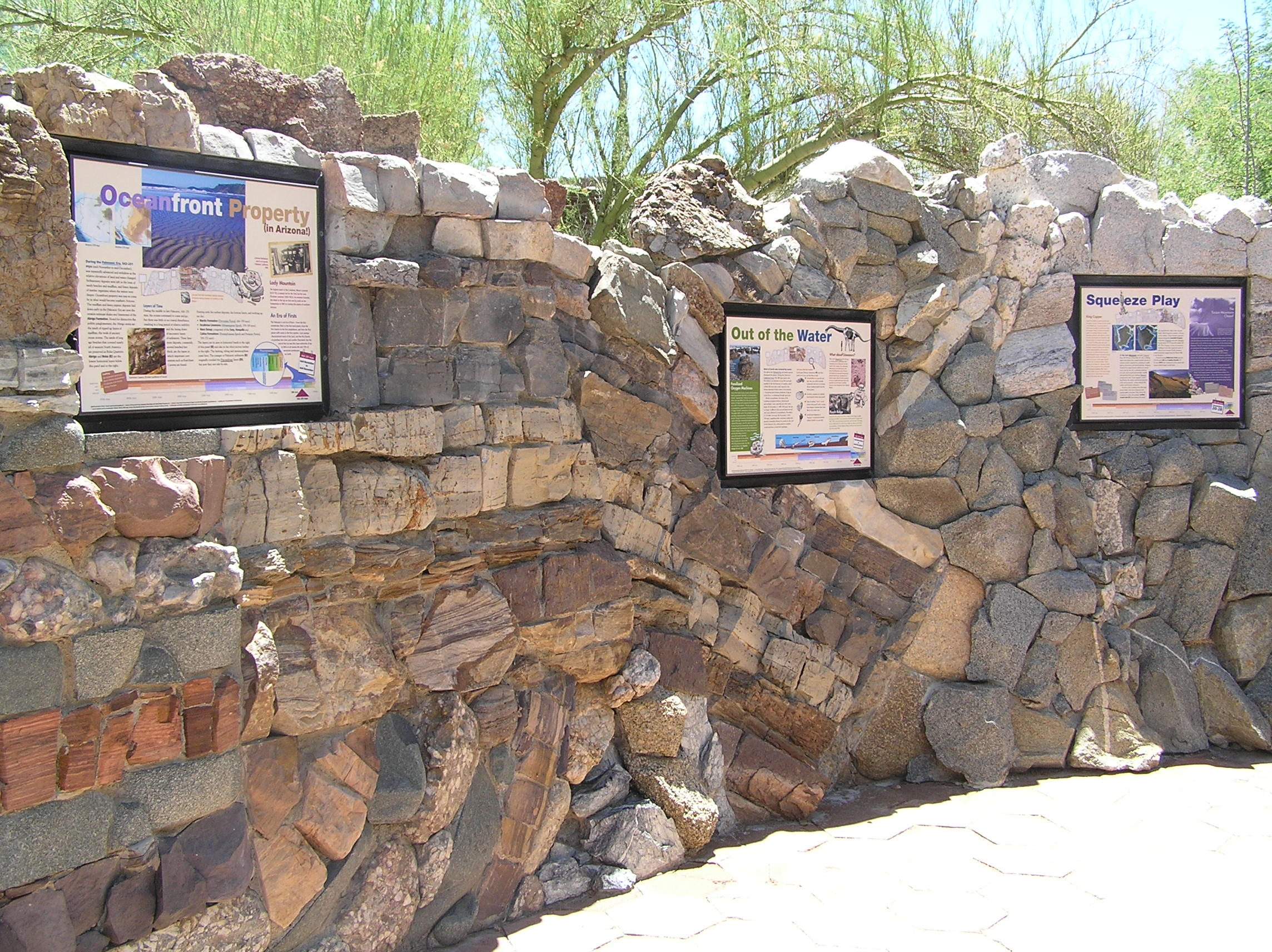
Geology Wall

In 2008, Travel+Leisure Magazine named Tohono Chul one of the Great Botanical Gardens of the World.

== History ==
In the 1920s, the entire northwest section of Tucson was considered ideal for growing frost-sensitive citrus and date palms. Maurice Reid owned property from Orange Grove Road to Ina Road and planted it with groves of citrus trees. He introduced black date palms and grapefruit to the property that would become Tohono Chul Park. Groves of citrus trees remained even after Samuel W. Seaney subdivided the area in 1931, calling it Catalina Citrus Estates.

Maurice Reid, acting as realtor for Seaney, sold the future site of Tohono Chul Park to John T. deBlois Wack in 1937. Wack was an avid polo player from Santa Barbara and a friend of the Reverend George Ferguson, pastor of the newly consecrated St. Philip's in the Foothills Episcopal Church. Following an afternoon spent drinking mint juleps, the Fergusons and young Gene Reid (future namesake of Tucson's Reid Park Zoo) escorted the Wacks around the property. The Wacks purchased an 80-acre (32.4 ha) parcel for $16,000 – or $200 an acre (.4 ha).

Later that year, a Santa Fe-style house (Exhibit House) was built on the property. During construction, the adobe bricks for the 18” thick outer walls were made on the premises and Ponderosa pine logs were brought down the winding back road from Mt. Lemmon to be used for the living room beams.

The Wacks spent little time in Tucson. By the end of World War II the home had exchanged hands several times, until in 1948, Colonel Robert Bagnell, a board member of the Tucson Red Cross and his wife Eugenia Sullivan Bagnell bought the Wack's 80-acre parcel. Known as “Las Palmas” during the Bagnell's tenure, the house had a rose garden and a wide grass lawn. Eugenia Bagnell donated a portion of the property to the Catholic Diocese of Tucson to serve as the site for St. Odilia's Catholic Church visible to the north; and in 1963 her son, John Sullivan, built a home on ten acres on the western edge of the property. Designed by Lewis Hall, a student of Tucson architect Josias Joesler, the hacienda-style home featured a traditional zaguan and fountained courtyard. Known as the “West House,” it is the site of the Tohono Chul Garden Bistro and La Fuente Museum Shop.

== Development ==
In 1966 Richard and Jean Wilson, started piecing together patches of the desert that would form the core of Tohono Chul, ultimately owning 37 acres (15 ha) of the Wack's original 80 acres (32.4 ha). The son of a Texas oilman, Richard Wilson was a geologist, trained at Yale and Stanford. With his wife Jean, he came to Tucson in 1962 to teach at the University of Arizona.

In 1968 the Wilsons purchased the section containing the hacienda-style “West House” and lived there for the next eight years. They never occupied the Wack's home, instead offering it to a succession of non-profit organizations as a halfway house or youth residence. It was during the 1970s that the couple was approached several times by developers seeking to purchase the land for commercial development. They always refused. Jean Wilson told them, “I don't want to sell the land. I don't want it cemented over. I want to preserve it.” In fact, when Pima County condemned a strip along the southern boundary of the property in order to widen Ina Road, Mr. Wilson demanded that they move every saguaro and replant it on their adjacent property.

In 1979 Jean Wilson opened the Haunted Bookshop on Northern Avenue along the eastern edge of the site. Once it was up and running, the Wilsons began planning their next project — a park. “At first we just went out and put down some lime to make a path and marked the names of some of the plants and bushes, but then it started to snowball.” In 1980 they received a citation from the Tucson Audubon Society for saving the desert greenspace and opening it to the public. Further motivated by a desire to preserve the Sonoran Desert they loved; they established the non-profit Foundation for the Preservation of Natural Areas in the early 1980s.

We wanted to keep something natural in the middle of all the (surrounding) development so that people could come easily for a few hours and get out of the traffic and learn something at the same time. It’s probably contrary to what most people would do, but we feel it's real important for people to have something like this.

Over time, demonstration gardens and special collections of native and near-native, arid-adapted plantings were added. The Wacks' original 1937 adobe house was carefully renovated in 1984 to provide space for changing art exhibits, a museum shop and administrative offices. Tohono Chul Park was formally dedicated as a 37-acre desert preserve on April 19, 1985. The Wilsons deeded the property to the non-profit foundation, Tohono Chul Park, Inc., in 1988. In the spring of 1995, an 11-acre (4.5 ha) parcel abutting the property on the north was slated for higher density rezoning and offered for sale. With the help of longtime member John Maher, Tohono Chul was able to acquire the property, establishing a memorial to John's late wife, Mary. The most recent addition came when the much-loved Haunted Bookshop closed in 1997. The Wilsons donated the land and building, thus adding the final acre — then there were 49 (19.8 ha).

The Wilson family also donated land at Hart Prairie (Flagstaff) and Muleshoe Ranch (Willcox) to the Nature Conservancy.

== Displays and exhibits ==
Within the park, Tohono Chul has developed thematic displays using its botanical collections which consist primarily of plants native to the Sonoran or Chihuahuan Deserts. They include more than 150 species of shrubs and trees; 300 species of cacti and succulents; and 50 species of wildflowers. In addition, Tohono Chul has the largest private collection of native Night-blooming Cereus - Peniocereus greggii - and each summer hosts "Bloom Night", the one night it is predicted the greatest number of cereus flowers will open.

Outdoor exhibits include:

- Ethnobotanical Garden — displays indigenous plants cultivated by Southwestern native peoples for food, medicine and other necessities of life, as well as those crops introduced by European settlers
- Riparian Habitat — replicates the stream-side natural vegetation of Arizona's threatened riparian communities
- Geology Wall — this display illustrates the geologic history of the nearby Santa Catalina Mountains
- Saguaro Discovery Trail — an exploration of the saguaro through its cultural connections to the Tohono O’odham and its botanical connections to the natural history of the Sonoran Desert
- Sin Agua Garden — a former parking lot converted into a rainwater harvesting demonstration
- Desert Living Courtyard — another former parking lot is now a series of garden vignettes in a variety of design aesthetics all promoting Xeriscape and intended to inspire homeowners to use native and arid-adapted plants in backyard landscapes
- Sonoran Seasons Garden — the five seasons of the Arizona Upland subdivision of the Sonoran Desert
- Desert palm Oasis — native fan palms shelter in this recreation an isolated mountain canyon found along the east coast of the Gulf of California

Tohono Chul's changing indoor arts and cultural exhibitions feature works by community groups and artists of all ages. Three exhibit spaces are used for different types of exhibitions, from large group shows lasting several months to smaller, one-man exhibits on display for six to eight weeks.

== See also ==
- List of botanical gardens and arboretums in Arizona
