= Casa Juan Paisano =

- U.S. National Register of Historic Places
- Location within Arizona
- Location: 3300 E. Camino Juan Paisano, Tucson, Arizona
- Coordinates: 32.3130°N 110.9205°W
- Area: 6 acres (2.4 ha)
- Built: 1961
- Architect: Juan Wørner Baz
- Architectural style: Modern Mexican Colonial
- NRHP reference No.: 13000545
- Added to NRHP: July 31, 2013

Casa Juan Paisano, at 3300 E. Camino Juan Paisano in Tucson, Arizona, was built in 1961. It was listed on the National Register of Historic Places in 2013. It was deemed significant as a work of Mexican architect Juan Wørner Bas, also known as Juan Worner y Bas.

It was built in 1961 for developer John W. Murphey and his wife Helen to be their home, and was named Casa Juan Paisano, which roughly translates as "the house of my countryman John". The street name Camino Juan Paisano, which roughly translates as "the road of my countryman John" appears to have been named at that time as well.

It has also been known as the John and Helen Murphey House.

Besides the house, the listing also included two contributing structures and two contributing objects.

== Juan Wørner Bas ==
Juan Wørner Bas (1928–2015) was a young architect in Mexico whose biggest work was the Continental Hilton hotel in Mexico City, "a modern high-rise in a historic area of the city", when the Murpheys recruited him to come to Tucson to design their home. (The Continental Hilton building, built 1954–55, was damaged in the 1985 Mexico City earthquake and demolished in 1986.) He went on to design 20 homes and commercial buildings in the Tucson area in what he termed a "Modern Mexican Colonial" style.

== See also ==
- St. Philip's in the Hills Episcopal Church, funded by the Murpheys, also National Register-listed
