= Casas Adobes, Arizona =

CDP in Pima County, Arizona

Casas Adobes
- CDP
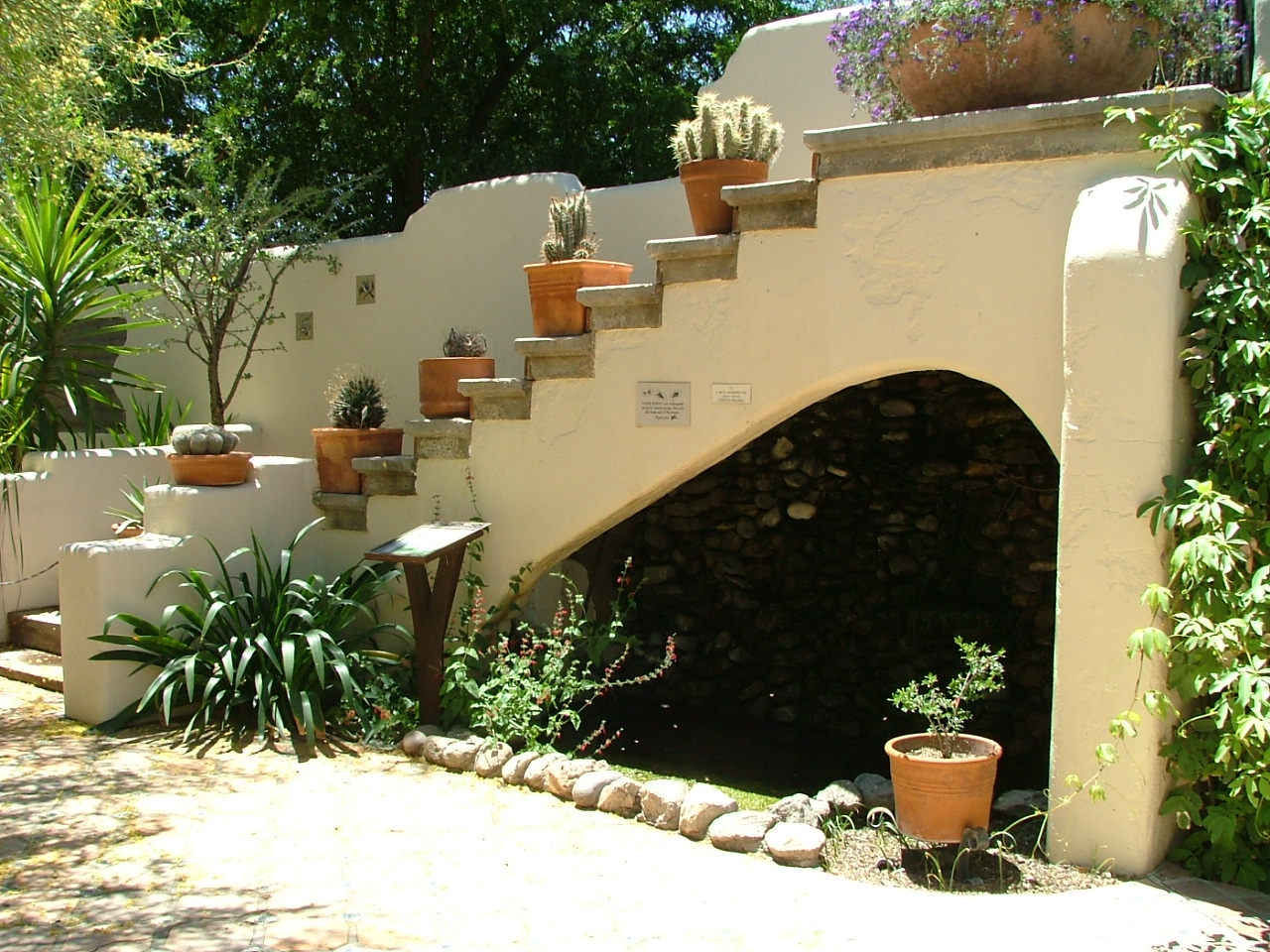
- Garden in Tohono Chul Park

- Location in Pima County and Arizona

- Location in the United States
- Coordinates: 32°20′47″N 111°0′35″W
- Country: United States
- State: Arizona
- County: Pima

Area
  - Total: 26.75 sq mi (69.29 km^{2})
  - Land: 26.64 sq mi (69.01 km^{2})
  - Water: 0.11 sq mi (0.28 km^{2})
- Elevation: 2,411 ft (735 m)

Population (2020)
  - Total: 70,973
  - Density: 2,663.6/sq mi (1,028.43/km^{2})
- Time zone: UTC-7 (MST (no DST))
- FIPS code: 04-10670
- GNIS ID: 37210

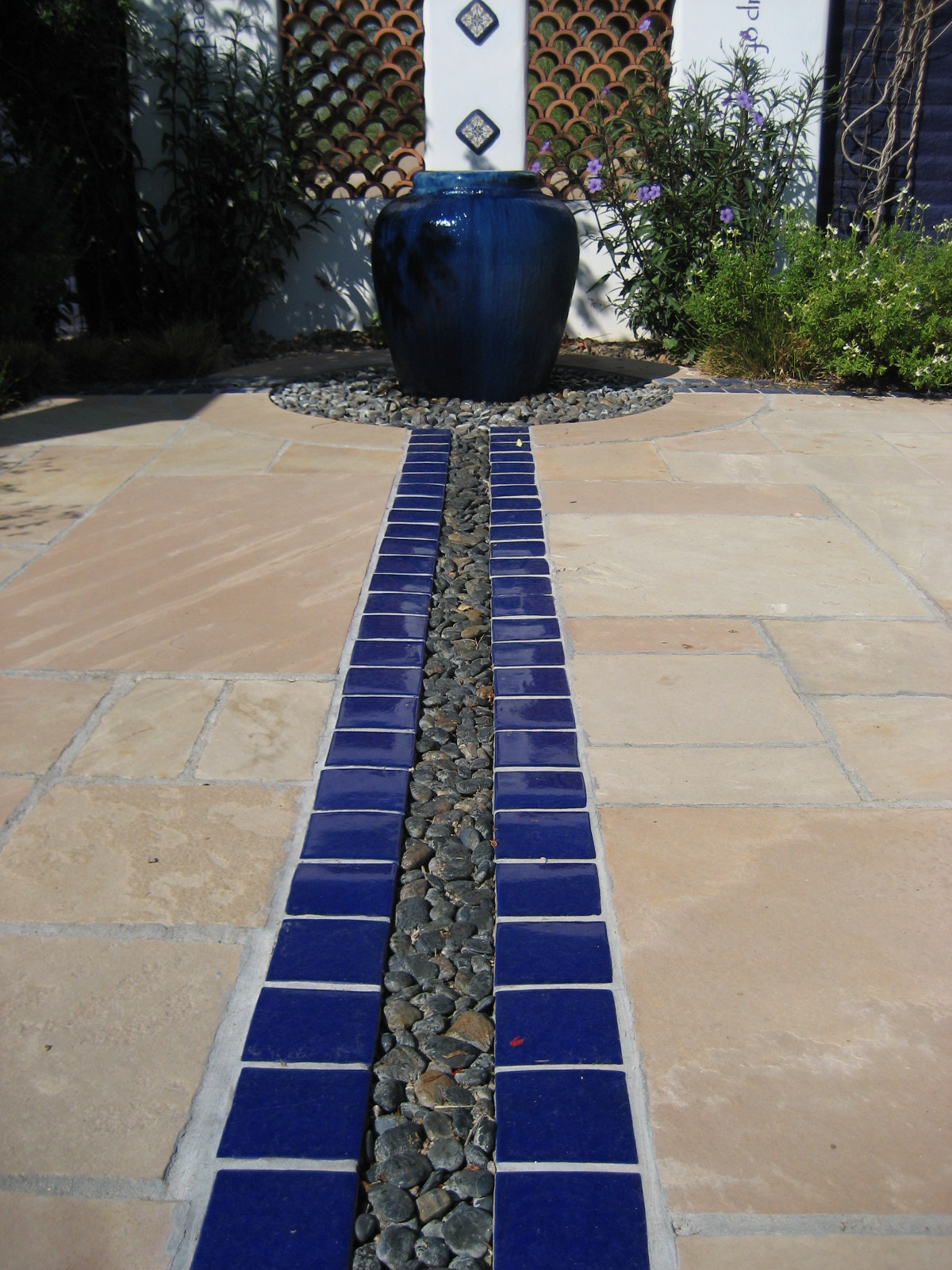
Moorish garden detail, Tohono Chul Park, Casas Adobes

Casas Adobes (Spanish: "Adobe Houses") is an unincorporated community and census-designated place (CDP) located in the northern metropolitan area of Tucson, Arizona (in Pima County). The population was 70,973 at the 2020 census. Casas Adobes is situated south and southwest of the town of Oro Valley, and west of the community of Catalina Foothills.

The attempted assassination of Representative Gabby Giffords, and the murders of chief judge for the U.S. District Court for Arizona, John Roll, and five other people on January 8, 2011, took place at a Safeway supermarket in Casas Adobes.

== History ==
Though Casas Adobes is an unincorporated community, it is older than both the towns of Oro Valley and Marana.

The area bordering the Cañada del Oro in the north, and the Rillito River in the south was primarily inhabited and utilized by cattle ranchers. Cattle ranches dominated the Casas Adobes area until the 1920s, when Tucson had grown far enough north and the advent of the automobile made the area more easily accessible.

One of the first individuals to build a home in the area was Maurice L. Reid, who came to Tucson in 1923 seeking a "walking cure" for tuberculosis. In the late 1920s Reid bought a 1,500 acres (6.1 km^{2}) former ranch, bounded by North Oracle Road to the east, Orange Grove Road to the south, Ina Road to the north, and North La Cholla Boulevard to the west. Reid planted more than 200 acres (0.81 km^{2}) of citrus trees and date palms, that would become the heart of Tucson's citrus industry. Over the years, Reid sold parcels of land for home sites, and in 1950 he sold the last of his land. Some larger residential estates continue to maintain the remaining citrus groves and orchards nearly a century later.

Leonie Boutall, who relocated to Arizona from Tennessee, decided to build a guest ranch in the early 1930s. The dry climate, her doctor told her, would relieve her bronchial troubles. Boutall bought 100 acres (0.40 km^{2}) of former ranch land just west of North Oracle Road, and south of a narrow dirt track called Orange Grove Road. She built Rancho Nezhone, a luxury guest ranch that drew the rich and famous to the sparsely settled area far north of Tucson. Kate Smith, Liberace, Gen. John Pershing and William "Hopalong Cassidy" Boyd were guests of the desert retreat which featured lush vegetation with monkeys and parrots. Boutall sold out of the property in 1948. Today the site is home to Mission Palms Apartments, where much of the original flora and several features remain, including a 300-stone wall in front of the property.

Sam Nanini and Giaconda, his wife, moved to Tucson in 1948 seeking to cure Giaconda Nanini's bronchial asthma. Beginning in the mid-1950s, the Italian born, transplanted Chicagoan developed three residential subdivisions on about 300 acres (1.2 km^{2}) that became the heart of the Casas Adobes community, giving the community its name. The subdivisions, along with Sam Nanini's landmark Casas Adobes Plaza, were considered by many to be Tucson's first suburb. Most of the homes in the subdivision are large ranch-style homes built with adobe bricks. Sam Nanini and his son William also later built the world-class Tucson National Resort, and the million-dollar residential subdivision, the Tucson National Estates.

=== 1997 incorporation attempt ===
In 1997, the Arizona legislature passed a law that suspended the ability of incorporated cities and towns in Pima County to prevent the incorporation of other cities within six miles of their borders for a period of approximately two years. That same year, the residents of Casas Adobes voted to incorporate as their own city. However, a series of appeals overturned the new law on constitutional grounds, and the Superior Court annulled the incorporation. A second vote for incorporation in 2001 failed 56 to 44 percent.

Casas Adobes community has grown to encompass a 23-square-mile (60 km^{2}) area inhabited by nearly 60,000 residents. While Casas Adobes' neighboring municipalities of Oro Valley, Marana and Tucson continue to build new homes and shopping centers, Casas Adobes is mostly built out. With the failure of incorporation attempts, it is likely that one or all three of the neighboring entities will annex portions of Casas Adobes in the future.

=== 2011 shooting ===
On January 8, 2011, 19 people were shot during a Congresswoman's meeting in a Safeway grocery store parking lot. Six people were killed, including a federal judge, John Roll, and a congressional aide. U.S. Representative for Arizona's 8th congressional district, Gabby Giffords, was shot in the head at close range. A 22-year-old local man named as Jared Lee Loughner was arrested in connection with the incident.

== Geography ==
Casas Adobes is located at 32°20′47″N 111°0′35″W (32.346368, −111.009844).

According to the United States Census Bureau, the CDP has a total area of 22.6 square miles (58.6 km^{2}), of which 22.6 square miles (58.6 km^{2}) is land and 0.04% is water.

== Demographics ==
Historical population
Census	Pop.	Note	%±
2000	54,011		—
2010	66,795		23.7%
2020	70,973		6.3%
U.S. Decennial Census

=== 2020 census ===
As of the 2020 census, Casas Adobes had a population of 70,973. The median age was 43.7 years. 18.3% of residents were under the age of 18 and 24.1% of residents were 65 years of age or older. For every 100 females there were 92.6 males, and for every 100 females age 18 and over there were 89.4 males age 18 and over.

99.3% of residents lived in urban areas, while 0.7% lived in rural areas.

There were 29,912 households in Casas Adobes, of which 24.0% had children under the age of 18 living in them. Of all households, 45.8% were married-couple households, 18.8% were households with a male householder and no spouse or partner present, and 28.0% were households with a female householder and no spouse or partner present. About 30.9% of all households were made up of individuals and 14.5% had someone living alone who was 65 years of age or older.

There were 31,939 housing units, of which 6.3% were vacant. The homeowner vacancy rate was 1.4% and the rental vacancy rate was 6.8%.

Racial composition as of the 2020 census
Race	Number	Percent
White	50,568	71.2%
Black or African American	1,668	2.4%
American Indian and Alaska Native	809	1.1%
Asian	3,002	4.2%
Native Hawaiian and Other Pacific Islander	128	0.2%
Some other race	4,636	6.5%
Two or more races	10,162	14.3%
Hispanic or Latino (of any race)	17,906	25.2%

=== 2000 census ===
As of the census of 2000, there were 54,011 people, 22,066 households, and 14,718 families residing in the CDP. The population density was 2,386.7 inhabitants per square mile (921.5/km^{2}). There were 23,655 housing units at an average density of 1,045.3 per square mile (403.6/km^{2}). The racial makeup of the CDP was 88.7% White, 1.7% Black or African American, 0.7% Native American, 2.2% Asian, 0.1% Pacific Islander, 4.5% from other races, and 2.3% from two or more races. 13.8% of the population were Hispanic or Latino of any race.

There were 22,066 households, out of which 29.8% had children under the age of 18 living with them, 54.3% were married couples living together, 9.2% had a female householder with no husband present, and 33.3% were non-families. 26.9% of all households were made up of individuals, and 10.2% had someone living alone who was 65 years of age or older. The average household size was 2.40 and the average family size was 2.93.

In the CDP, the population was spread out, with 23.0% under the age of 18, 8.0% from 18 to 24, 28.2% from 25 to 44, 24.6% from 45 to 64, and 16.1% who were 65 years of age or older. The median age was 39 years. For every 100 females, there were 90.2 males. For every 100 females age 18 and over, there were 86.7 males.

The median income for a household in the CDP was $49,736, and the median income for a family was $57,926. Males had a median income of $40,323 versus $29,892 for females. The per capita income for the CDP was $24,230. About 3.9% of families and 5.3% of the population were below the poverty line, including 5.2% of those under age 18 and 5.0% of those age 65 or over.

== Education ==
=== Primary and secondary schools ===
Casas Adobes is served by three public school districts:

- Amphitheater Public Schools is the primary school district serving Casas Adobes. Some Amphi schools serving Casas Adobes perform among the top in the state academically, and include Canyon del Oro High School. In 2007 and again in 2010, Newsweek Magazine rated Canyon del Oro in the top 5% of public schools in the U.S. Amphitheater High School serves the south-central neighborhoods of Casas Adobes, between River Road and Orange Grove Road.
  - District elementary schools in Casas Adobes include Marion Donaldson Elementary School, Winifred Harelson Elementary School, Mesa Verde Elementary School, and Lulu Walker Elementary School
  - La Cima Middle School is located in Casas Adobes
- Marana Unified School District serves the far northwestern neighborhoods of Casas Adobes. Mountain View High School serves this area of Casas Adobes.
  - District schools in Casas Adobes include Butterfield Elementary School, Ironwood Elementary School, and Thornydale Elementary School.
- Flowing Wells Unified School District serves the far western neighborhoods of Casas Adobes. Flowing Wells High School serves this area of Casas Adobes.

=== Public libraries ===
Pima County Public Library operates the Nanini Branch Library in Casas Adobes.

== Points of interest ==
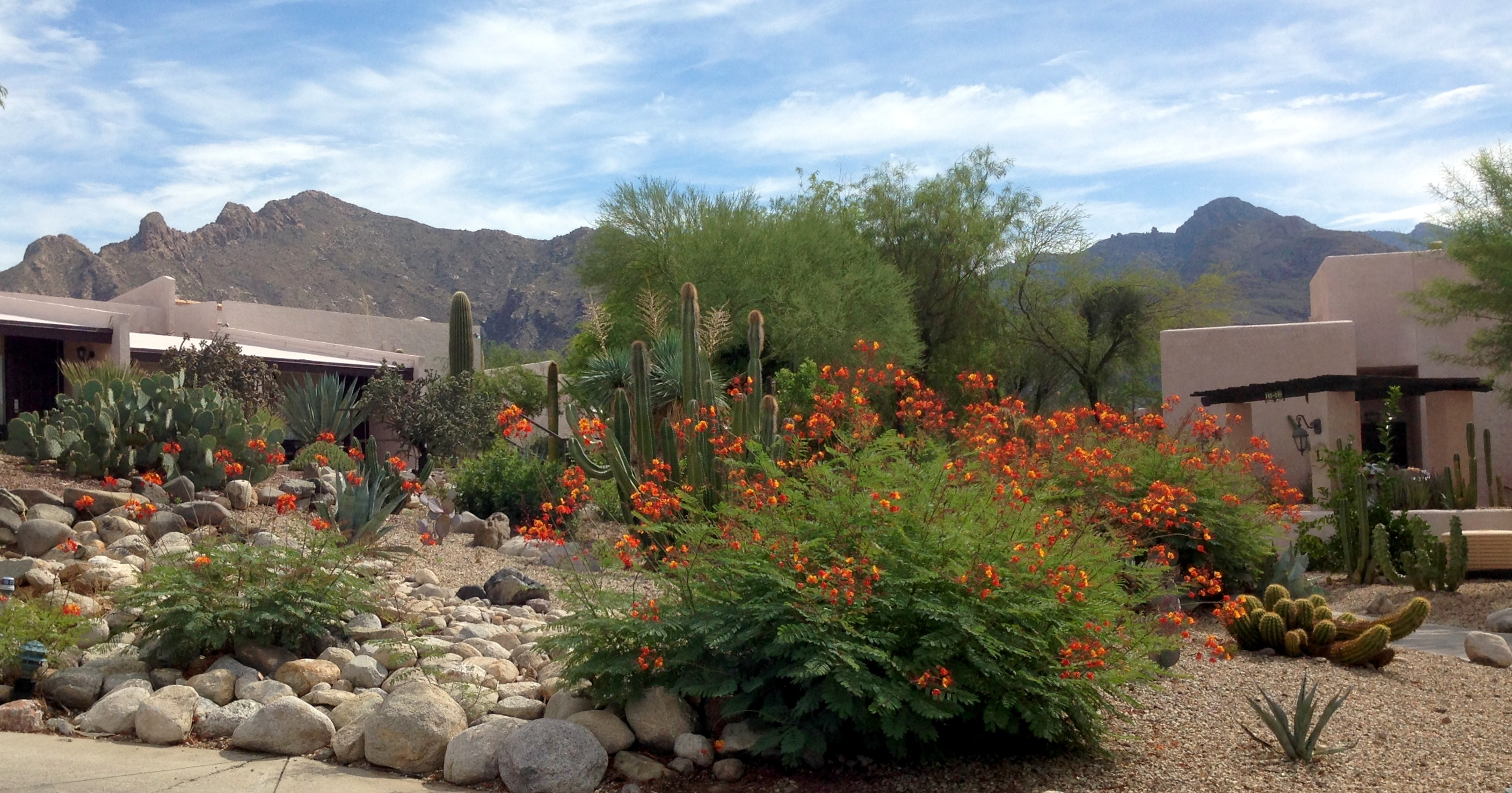
Westward Look Resort garden, 2014

Casas Adobes is the location of one of southern Arizona's largest and most biologically diverse nature preserves. Tohono Chul Park is a private nature park located northwest of North Oracle and West Ina roads on North Paseo del Norte. Tohono Chul, Tohono O'odham for "desert corner," was created in 1985 after Richard and Jane Wilson dedicated their historic home and property to the preservation of the desert and the education of visitors on the splendor of the native plants and wildlife.

Casas Adobes features one of the highest concentrations of Mid-century modern architecture in the Tucson area with many prominent architects including Friedman and Jobusch, Nicholas Sakellar, Tom Gist, and Edward Nelson designing properties in the region. Notable examples include Saint Odilia Catholic Church, St Andrew's Presbyterian Church, Dove of Peace Lutheran Church, Arizona Bank (now Bank of America) as well as numerous residences in Catalina Village, Westward Look Estates, Casas Adobes Estates and Samalayuca Estates among other neighborhoods.

The Casas Adobes Plaza is a retail destination, dating back to 1948. The Plaza is situated on the southwest corner of North Oracle and West Ina roads, and features some of the most authentic Mediterranean architecture in the area. Original Italian vignettes, statues, and fountains are incorporated into the plaza. Casas Adobes Plaza has a historic Mediterranean observation tower.

Westward Look Resort is located in Casas Adobes, beginning in the early 20th century as a dude ranch in the foothills of the Santa Catalina Mountains north of Tucson. The property was significantly expanded in the late 1960s by modernist architect Edward Nelson and became the Tucson area's first resort. The original adobe home commissioned by ranch founders William and Maria Watson in the 1910s by Tucson architect Merritt Starkweather remains the heart of Westward Look Resort and is named the "Vigas Room."

Casas Adobes has a nationally prominent golf resort built in the 1960s by Sam Nanini, the Omni Tucson National Resort. Hosting the PGA Tour Tucson Open for more than forty years, golfers Jack Nicklaus (who was discovered and promoted by Nanini), Arnold Palmer, Lee Trevino, Tom Watson, Tom Kite and Johnny Miller have played at Tucson National. Early tournaments were celebrity-hosted by Dean Martin and others.

While Casas Adobes remains unincorporated, the community has distinguished itself from the other suburbs to the north and northwest of Tucson as the oldest community.

== See also ==
- List of census-designated places in Arizona
