= St. Philip's in the Hills Episcopal Church =

NRHP-listed church in Pima County, Arizona

- Saint Philip's in the Hills Episcopal Church
- U.S. National Register of Historic Places
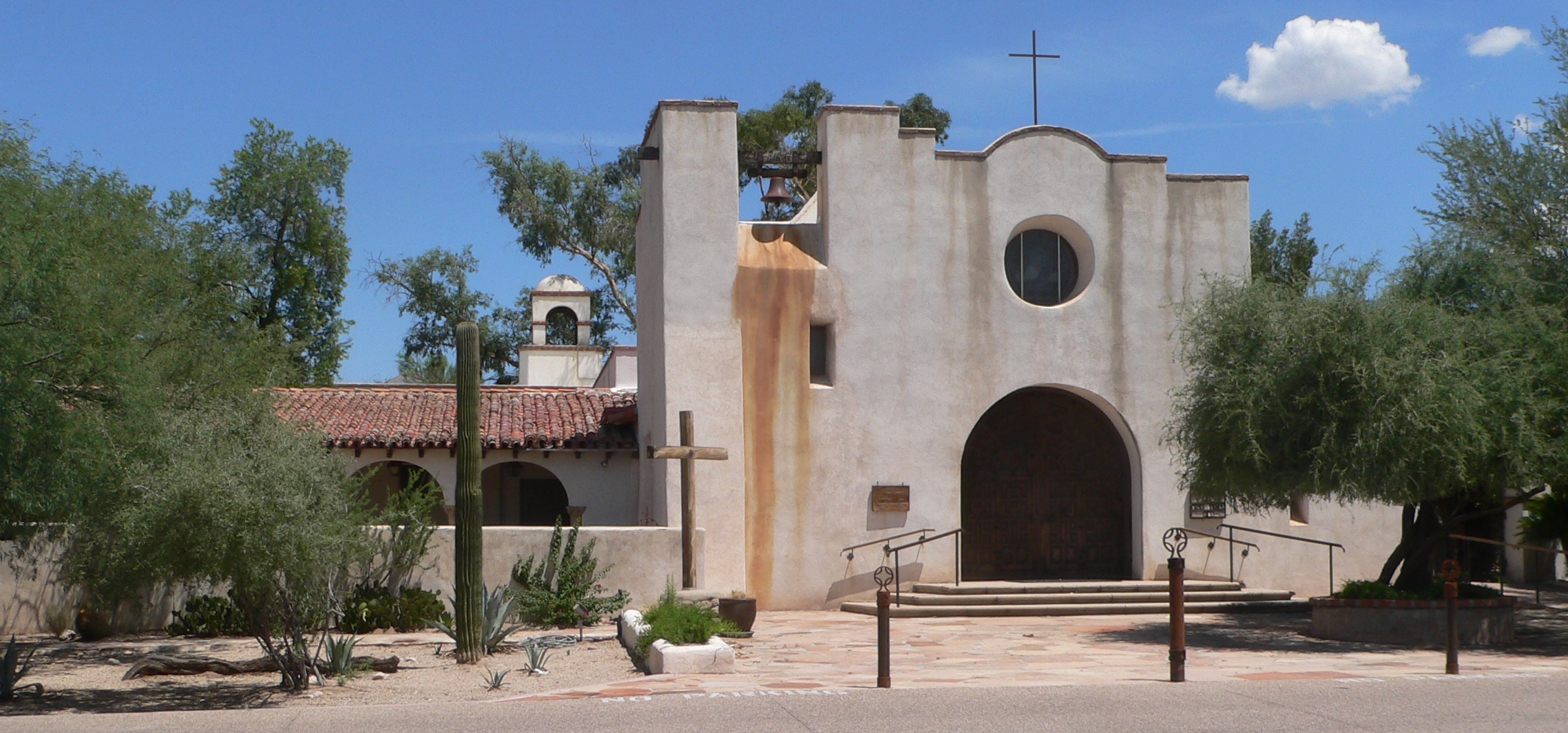

- Location within Arizona Location within the United States
- Location: 4440 N. Campbell Ave., Tucson, Arizona
- Coordinates: 32°17′17″N 110°56′36″W
- Area: less than one acre
- Built: 1936
- Architect: Joesler, Josias Thomas
- Architectural style: Mission architecture/Spanish Revival
- NRHP reference No.: 04001347
- Added to NRHP: December 17, 2004

Saint Philip's in the Hills Episcopal Church is an historic church at 4440 N. Campbell Avenue in Tucson, Arizona, United States. It was built in 1936 and added to the National Register of Historic Places in 2004. John and Helen Murphey, residents of Tucson, initially sought to commission architect Josias Joesler to construct a private chapel for them at their home. Joesler convinced them to fund the construction of a church at the intersection of Campbell Avenue and River Road in a then-undeveloped area of Tucson. The church's first rector was Fr. George Ferguson.

The church reported 1,826 members in 2020 and 1,232 members in 2023; no membership statistics were reported in 2024 parochial reports. Plate and pledge income reported for the congregation in 2024 was $1,689,063 with average Sunday attendance (ASA) of 404 persons.

== See also ==
- Casa Juan Paisano, home of John and Helen Murphey, also National Register-listed
