= Rattlesnake Bridge =

Footbridge in Arizona

Coordinates: 32.221°N 110.962°W

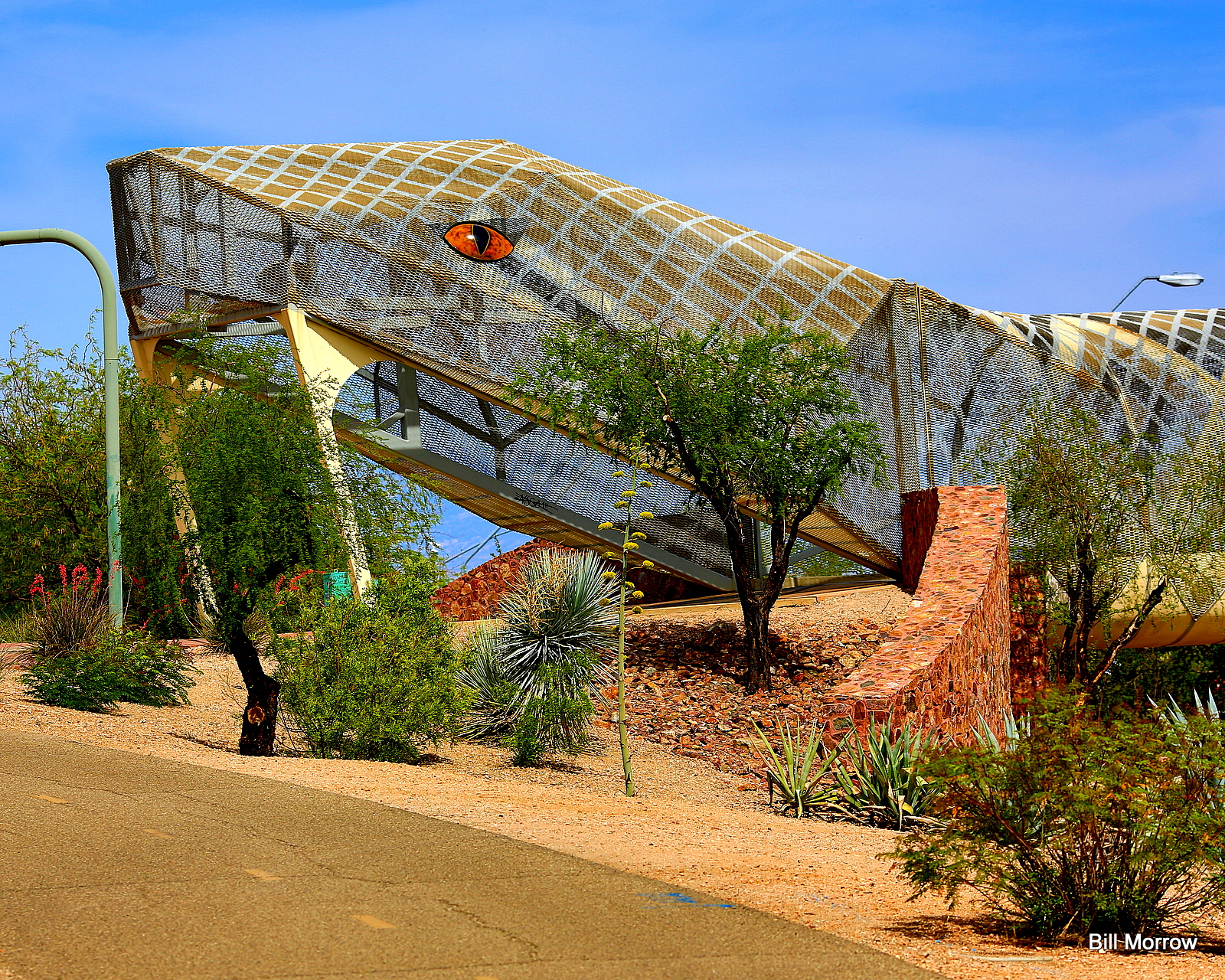
Rattlesnake Bridge head (2014)

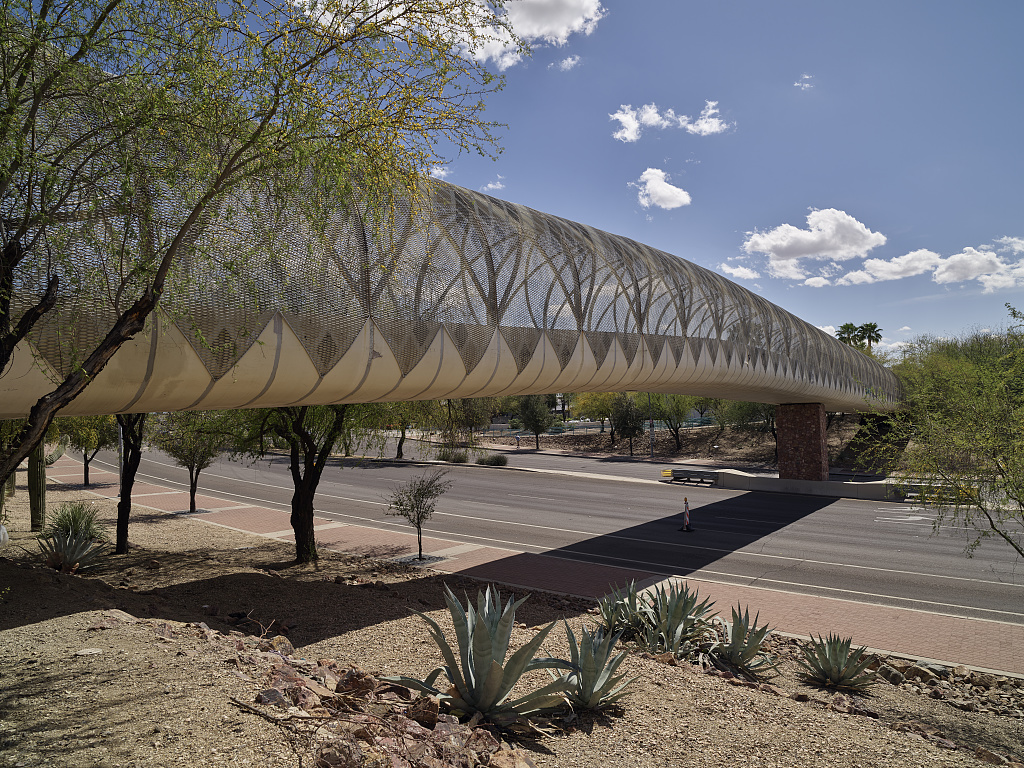
Rattlesnake Bridge body (2018)

Rattlesnake Bridge in Tucson, Arizona, in the United States, is a 280-foot (85 m)-long footbridge over Broadway Boulevard between Iron Horse Park and Aviation Bikeway. Designed for the use of pedestrians and cyclists, the crossing is also called Diamondback Bridge or Snake Bridge and looks like one of the area's endemic rattlesnakes. An artist named Simon Donovan designed the bridge, which cost $2.5 million to build in 2002. The snake's eyes originally lit up at night, and the south end of the bridge has a huge rattle that makes a sound as travelers exit. The interior of the bridge is lit at night. The bridge won a design award from the U.S. Federal Highway Administration.

== See also ==
- Tohono Chul Park
