= Josias Joesler =

Swiss-born American architect (1895–1956)

- Born: Josias Thomas Joesler; 1895; Zurich, Switzerland
- Died: February 12, 1956 (aged 60–61); Tucson, Arizona
- Education: Königliche Bayerische Akademie der Bildenden Kunst
- Known for: Architecture, Design
- Notable work: St. Philip's in the Hills Episcopal Church
- Movement: revival

Josias Thomas Joesler was a Swiss-American architect who later worked and eventually died in Tucson, Arizona.

== Life and work ==
Joesler was born in 1895 in Zurich, Switzerland. His architectural legacy would come to articulate the romantic revival Tucson style of the first half of the 20th century. Educated in Germany and France, he lived in Spain before moving on the new New World, living and working in Havana, Cuba, Mexico City and Los Angeles, California. Joesler married his wife Natividad and the two moved to Tucson in 1927.

His major surviving commercial architectural buildings are spread throughout the historic Tucson core. Extant buildings are clustered along the Fourth Avenue shopping district and the Broadway Village Shopping center on the corner of Country Club and Broadway. Other major commercial buildings include the Saint Philip's Church and Plaza at Campbell and River Road, St. Michael and All Angels Episcopal Church at 5th and Wilmot and The Ghost Ranch Lodge on Miracle Mile.

Many of his residential buildings are in the Catalina Foothills Estates and in the Historic Blennman–Elm Neighborhood, listed in the National Register of Historic Places. His buildings utilized traditional southwestern hand crafted decorative motifs including: hand applied plaster, hand hewn beams, colored concrete floors and decorative iron/tin work.

Joesler died in Tucson on 12 February 1956. Natividad Joesler died in Spain June 23, 1963.

Note: According to historian David Leighton, of the Arizona Daily Star newspaper, Joesler Village on North Campbell Avenue and East River Road, in Tucson, Arizona, is named in his honor and there is a small street in the Sam Hughes Neighborhood that bears his name.

== Works ==
=== Extant buildings ===
All buildings located in Tucson unless otherwise noted.

- Arizona History Museum (1954) (Arizona Historical Society headquarters, Joesler's last project) – 949 E. Second St. at Park Ave.
- Broadway Village Shopping Center (1939) – Southwest corner of Broadway Blvd. and Country Club Road.
- Don Martin Apartments – 605 East 9th Street.
- Haynes Building (1928) – 310 East 6th Street
- Fourth Avenue Shops (1928) – 616 North 4th Avenue
- Ghost Ranch Lodge – 801 West Miracle Mile
- Sigma Alpha Epsilon Fraternity House (1949) – 1509 East 2nd Street
- Seventh-Day Adventist Chapel (1942) – 1200 North Mountain Avenue
- Tucson Unified School District Educational Building Expansion (1948) – 1010 East 10th Street
- St. Philip's in the Hills Episcopal Church (1936) – Northeast corner of River Road and Campbell Avenue
- Murphey-Keith Office Building & Catalina Foothills Estate Estate Sales Office/Joesler Studio (1937) – River Road and Campbell Avenue
- Hutton Webster Studio and Residence (1939) – River Road and Campbell Avenue
- Murphey-Keith Building Company Office (1940) – River Road and Campbell Avenue.
- El Merendero Tea Room & Gift Shop (1937) – River Road and Campbell Avenue.
- St. Philip's Park (1936) – River Road and Campbell Avenue.
- Catalina Foothills School (1931) Built by the New Deal Works Projects Administration (WPA) – River Road east of Campbell Avenue.
- Catalina Foothills Estates – North of River Road between Campbell Avenue and Hacienda del Sol
- Downtown Motor Hotel (1941) – 383 S Stone Ave
- Americana Apartments (1941) – 151 S. Eastbourne
- Grace Mansion (Eleven Arches) (1937) – Catalina Foothills Estates
- Hacienda Del Sol reconstruction (late 1930s) – Hacienda Del Sol
- Joesler/Loerpabel Residence (1936)
- Johnson Residence (1936)
- St. Michael and All Angels Episcopal Church (1953) – 602 North Wilmot Road
- Our Saviour's Lutheran Church (1948) Campbell and Helen (Joesler was the local architect overseeing the project, and while he did make adjustments to the plan, such as a "re-siting" on the property and some decorative elements, he was not the original designer. A plan was chosen from a library of plans held by the Lutheran church. The congregation chose a plan, and Joesler oversaw the building. In the hallway of the offices there is a water color that Joesler painted that has his signature with "project architect" beneath his name. This church has mistakenly been attributed to Joesler, but articles in the ADS give the correct information.)

=== Demolished buildings ===
- Old World Addition (1927–1928) – Mabel Street, Campbell Avenue, Elm Street and Martin Avenue. Demolished (1970s)

=== NRHP-listed ===
Numerous works by Joesler were listed on the National Register of Historic Places as result of three studies:

- "Architecture and Planning of Josias Joesler and John Murphey in Tucson, AZ MPS" under National Register reference number 64501083,
- that study's later extension, under reference number 64501168 (AD), and
- "Residential Architecture of Josias Joesler in Tucson, Arizona, 1927-1956 MPS", under reference number 64501201.

All of the following are in Tucson and are listed on the National Register for their architecture:

- James P. and Sarah Adams House, 5201 N. Camino Escuela.
- Erskine P. Caldwell House (1940), 1915 E. Camino Miraval. (with John W. Murphey and Leo B. Keith)
- John P. and Helena S. Corcoran House, 2200 E. Calle Lustre.
- Don Martin Apartment House, 605 E 9th St.
- El Conquistador Water Tower, Broadway and Randolph Way.
- The Eleven Arches Eleven Arches, 5201 N. Hacienda Del Sol.
- First Joesler House, 3408 E. Fairmount St.
- P.W. Fletcher House, 4850 N. Campbell Ave. Tucson, AZ (with John W. Murphey)
- Gabel House, 5445 N. Camino Escuela.
- Ghost Ranch Lodge, 801 W. Miracle Mile Rd.
- Arthur C. and Helen Neel Hall House, 4875 N. Campbell Ave.
- Lewis D.W. Hall House, 3160 E. Via Celeste.
- Haynes Building, 312-314 E. Sixth St.
- Hecker House, 2635 N. Camino Principal.
- Phillip G. McFadden House, 5130 Camino Real.
- St. Philip's in the Hills Episcopal Church, 4440 N. Campbell Ave.
- Charles S. Todd House, 11511 E. Speedway Blvd.
- Type A at 2101 E. Water St, 2101 E. Water St.
- Type B at 2019 E. Water St, 2019 E Water St.
- Nellie Mae Kellogg Van Schaick House, 4141 N. Pontatoc Rd.
- One or more works in Blenman-Elm Historic District, bounded by Grant, Country Club, Speedway and Campbell
- One or more works in Catalina Vista Historic District, bounded by Grant, Tucson Blvd., Elm St., and Campbell Ave.
- One or more works in El Montevideo Historic District, 3700 and 3800 blocks of streets between Broadway & 5th St.
- One or more works in boundary increase of Feldman's Historic District, generally N. of E. Speedway Blvd.; W. of N. Park Ave.; S. of E. Lee St.; E. of N. 7th St.
- One or more works in the original district and in the boundary increase of Sam Hughes Neighborhood Historic District, roughly bounded by E. Speedway Blvd., N. Country Club Rd., E. Broadway Blvd., and N. Campbell Ave.
