= Mormon Battalion Monument =

Mormon Battalion Monument may refer to

- Mormon Battalion Monument (Presidio Park, San Diego)
- Mormon Battalion Monument (Salt Lake City)
- Mormon Battalion Monument (Sandoval County, New Mexico)
- Mormon Battalion Historic Site, Museum in San Diego, California
- This Is the Place Heritage Park, living-history park in Salt Lake City, Utah with battalion monument and museum
- Fort Moore Pioneer Memorial, Los Angeles, California
