= Neyland Stadium =

American sports stadium in Knoxville, Tennessee

Coordinates: 35.9550°N 83.9250°W

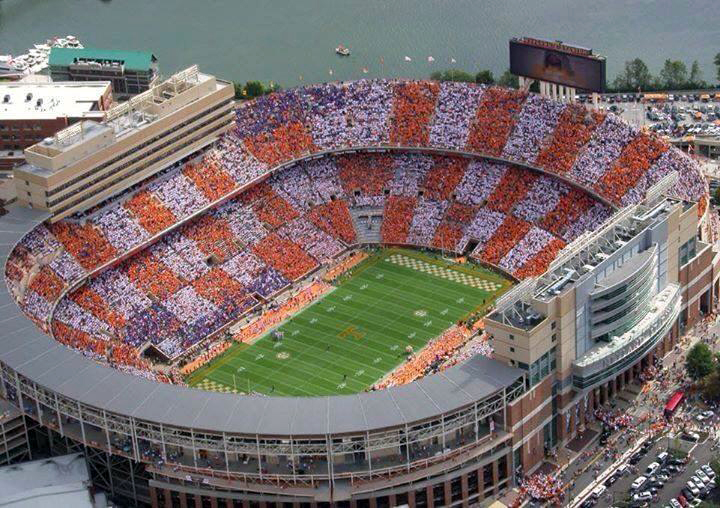
- Aerial photograph of Neyland Stadium
- Interactive map of Neyland Stadium
- Former names: Shields–Watkins Field (1921–present)
- Address: 1235 Phillip Fulmer Way; Knoxville, Tennessee; 37916
- Owner: University of Tennessee
- Operator: University of Tennessee
- Capacity: 101,915 (since 2022)
- Surface: Grass (1921–1967, 1994–present); Artificial turf (1968–1993)
- Record attendance: 109,061, on September 18, 2004, vs. Florida

Construction
- Groundbreaking: March 21, 1921; 105 years ago
- Opened: September 24, 1921; 105 years ago
- Renovated: 2006, 2008, 2010, 2022
- Expanded: 1926, 1929, 1937–1938, 1948, 1962, 1966, 1968, 1972, 1976, 1980, 1987, 1990, 1996
- Cost: $42,000 ($575,000 in 2021) $136.4 million (2004–2010 renovations)
- Architect: McCarty Holsaple McCarty (renovations)

Tenants
- Tennessee Volunteers football (NCAA) (1921–present)

Website
- utsports.com/neylandstadium

Neyland Stadium (/ˈniːlənd/ NEE-lənd) is a sports stadium in Knoxville, Tennessee, United States. It serves primarily as the home of the Tennessee Volunteers football team, but is also used to host large conventions and has been a site for several National Football League (NFL) exhibition games. The stadium's official capacity is 101,915. Constructed in 1921 as Shields–Watkins Field (which is now the name of the playing surface), the stadium has undergone 16 expansion projects, at one point reaching a capacity of 104,079 before being slightly reduced by alterations in the following decade. Neyland Stadium is the sixth largest stadium in the United States, the eighth largest stadium in the world, and the third largest stadium in the Southeastern Conference. The stadium is named for Robert Neyland, who served three stints as head football coach at the University of Tennessee between 1926 and 1952.

== History ==
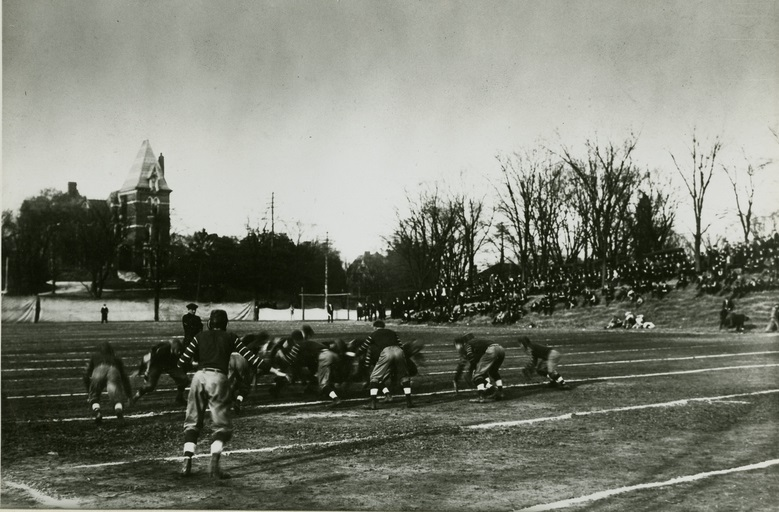
Tennessee's football team played at Wait Field (where the Walters Life Science Building now stands) from 1908 to 1920

The Tennessee Volunteers football team originally played at Baldwin Park, which was once located between Grand Avenue and Dale Avenue, north of Fort Sanders. From 1908 to 1920, the team played at Wait Field, which was located where the Walters Life Science Building now stands.

The stadium was first conceived in 1919. Colonel W.S. Shields, president of Knoxville's City National Bank and a University of Tennessee trustee, provided the initial capital to prepare and equip an athletic field. Thus, when the original stadium – the lower level of the current stadium's West Stands – was completed in March 1921, it was called Shields–Watkins Field in honor of the donor and his wife, Alice Watkins-Shields. However, the project ran out of funds and was suspended temporarily until MacGregor Smith suggested at a meeting of the university's Scarabbean Senior Society in mid 1921 that the students and faculty finish the project together. At the group's behest, students and faculty finished the field over a two-day period. It had a capacity of 3,200. An invitational track meet was then held as a celebration and thus became the first event at Neyland Stadium. The first UT football game at the stadium took place on September 24, 1921, with the Vols defeating Emory & Henry, 27–0. The first night game at Neyland Stadium was played on September 16, 1972, with the Vols defeating Penn State, 28–21.

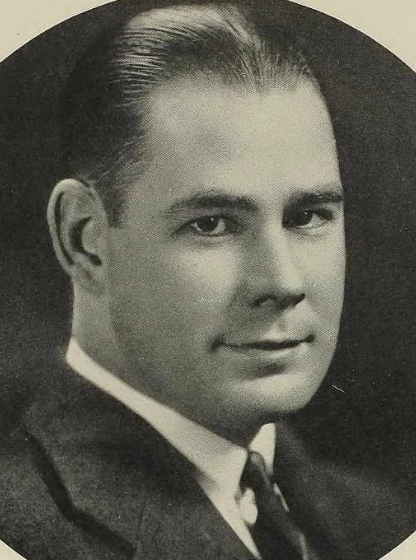
The stadium was named after General Robert Neyland in 1962

In 1962, the stadium was renamed Neyland Stadium in honor of General Robert Neyland, the recently deceased former athletic director and coach. Neyland, the man credited with making the Vols a national football power, coached the team from 1926 to 1952, with two interruptions for military service. In 1968, the stadium became one of the first stadiums to have an artificial turf surface. It stayed until natural grass was restored to the field in 1994. Reflecting the Vols' growth in stature, the stadium's capacity jumped more than 14-fold during his 38-year association with UT as either an assistant coach (1925), head coach (three separate tenures from 1926 to 1952), or athletic director (1936–1941 and 1946-1962). By comparison, when Neyland arrived in Knoxville in 1925, Shields-Watkins Field was not even a fraction the size of Tennessee's largest stadium at the time Vanderbilt's Dudley Field. Shortly before his death, he spearheaded the stadium's first major expansion. The plans he drafted were so far ahead of their time that they have formed the basis for every expansion since then. The playing surface is still named Shields–Watkins Field.

The latest additions and updates to the facility were part of a $136.4 million series of renovations, beginning in 2004 and completed by 2010. They included the bricking around the field and the removal of the previous hedges, numerous changes to the inside and outside of the stadium structure, additions and reconfigurations of seating areas, as well as new home locker, press, and varsity rooms.

In a Spring 2001 poll in The Sporting News, Neyland Stadium was ranked as the nation's #1 college football stadium. In 2004, Sports Illustrated ranked Neyland Stadium, the University of Tennessee campus, and the surrounding Knoxville area, as the best college football weekend experience. On April 8, 2009, it was announced that Neyland Stadium was one of seventy stadiums named for the United States' bid to host either the 2018 or 2022 World Cup.

=== Attendance records ===
Attendance has been recorded for Tennessee Volunteer football games at Neyland Stadium since 1946. Average attendance since that year has been 68,925 fans per game. The largest crowd ever recorded at Neyland Stadium was 109,061 on September 18, 2004, when Tennessee defeated Florida, 30–28. Tennessee set a school record by averaging 107,595 fans per home game in 2000.

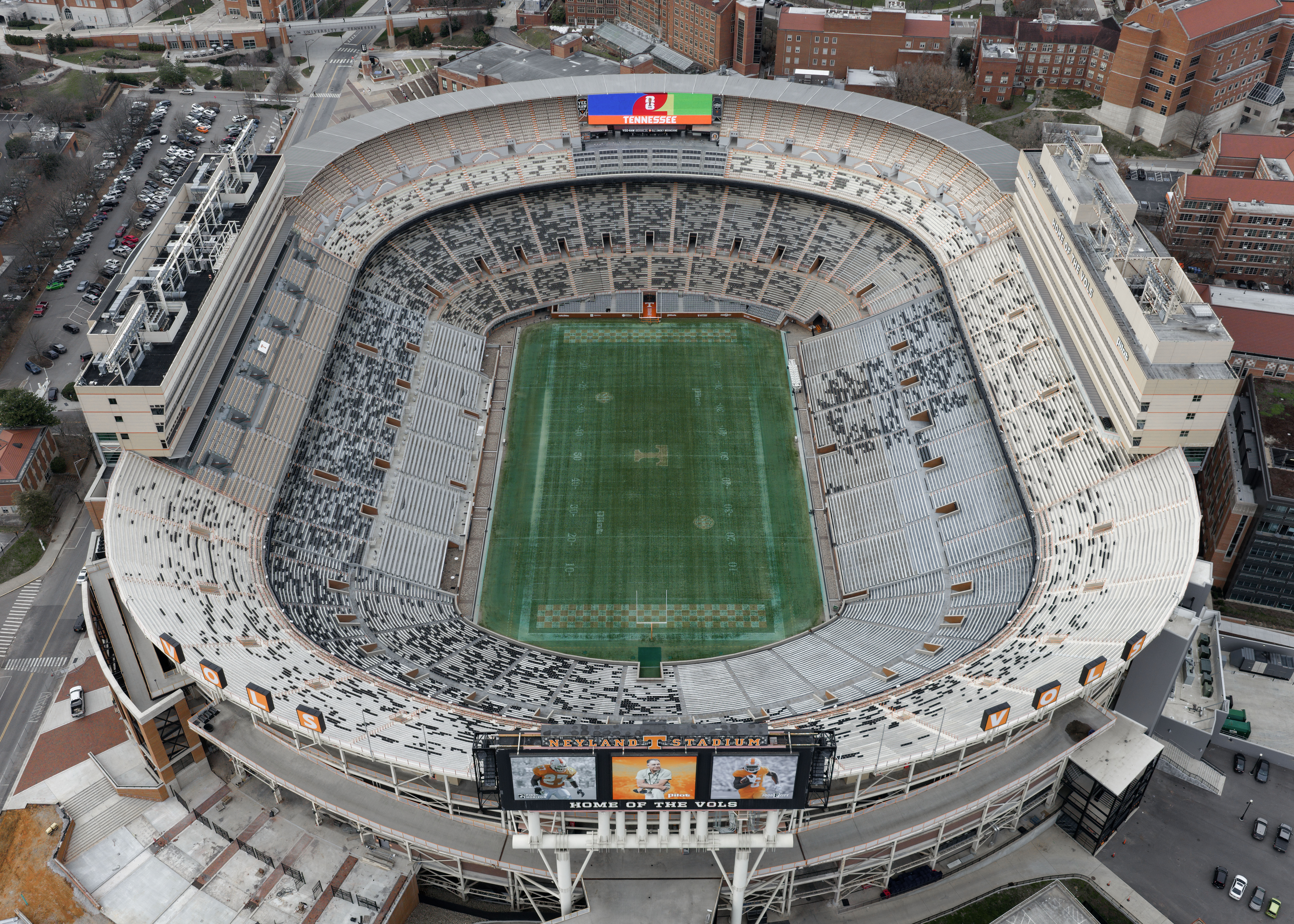
Aerial view in 2026

Attendance	Opponent	Year	Result
109,061	Florida	2004	30–28
108,768	Florida	2000	23–27
108,722	Florida	2002	13–30
108,625	UNLV	2004	42–17
108,472	LSU	2001	26–18
108,470	Georgia	2005	14–27
108,064	Southern Miss	2000	19–16
107,881	South Carolina	2003	23–20
107,828	Auburn	2004	10–34
107,745	Miami (Florida)	2002	3–26

=== Vols' performance at Neyland ===
Through week one of the 2022 season, the Tennessee Volunteers football team had compiled a record of 485 wins, 141 losses, and 17 ties at Neyland, for a winning percentage of .767. The team has had 37 perfect home records, the last coming in the 2022 season. The team's longest home winning streak was 30, set between December 8, 1928, and October 21, 1933. The Vols have never had more than four consecutive losses at Neyland Stadium.

=== Other uses ===
Neyland Stadium is occasionally used for concerts, political rallies, and religious gatherings. One of Neyland Stadium's most notable non-sporting events took place in May 1970, when the stadium hosted the Billy Graham Crusade, with President Richard Nixon as a guest speaker. The event occurred just three weeks after the Kent State shootings, at the height of the anti-war movement, and several anti-war protestors were arrested for trying to disrupt the event. The Jacksons performed three concerts at Neyland Stadium in August 1984, during their Victory Tour. East Tennessee native Kenny Chesney performed in Neyland Stadium in June 2003.

Neyland Stadium has hosted several NFL exhibition games, most recently in 1995, when the Washington Redskins played the Houston Oilers. The Knox County Football Jamboree, a preseason event for local high school teams, was held annually at the stadium until 2013. The discontinuation of the Jamboree at Neyland Stadium was due in part to maintaining the condition of the field in the month prior to the beginning of college football.

Soccer was played at the stadium on April 27, 1991, as Northern Irish club Linfield travelled to Knoxville to play a team of American Professional Soccer League all-stars in front of 12,468 fans. The all-stars won 1–0. This was done as part of a bid for Knoxville to further host games in the 1994 FIFA World Cup, though Neyland was ultimately not included.

== Structure and seating ==
=== Growth ===
Shields–Watkins Field opened in 1921 with a single grandstand along the west sideline–the lower portion of the current facility's West Stands–having a capacity of 3,200. The East Stands were added five years later in 1926 to increase capacity to 6,800. The West Stands were increased from 17 rows to 42 rows in 1930, increasing capacity to 17,860.

In 1937, a small row of seats (called North Section X) was constructed across the north end zone, adding 1,500 seats. The next year, in 1938, the East Stands were expanded to 44 rows. The capacity after these expansions was 31,390.

In 1948, the south end zone was enclosed in a "horseshoe" style (see Harvard Stadium for an example) with 15,000 seats, bringing total capacity to 46,290.

Several expansions were undertaken in the 1960s. First, in 1962, the West Stands were double-decked, adding 5,837 seats and a press box. In 1966 North Section X was replaced by a grandstand (the North Stands) with 5,895 seats. In 1968, the East Stands were double-decked as well (6,307), bringing total capacity to 64,429.

The two Upper Decks were connected to fully enclose the south end zone during two expansions in 1972 and 1976. The 1972 Southwest Upper Deck addition extended the West Upper Deck to the south by 6,221 seats, and the 1976 Southeast Upper Deck addition extended the East Upper Deck to the south by 9,600, giving contiguous upper seating around three sides, and increasing total capacity to 80,250.

In 1980, the North Stands were rebuilt, netting a capacity increase of 10,999 seats. It also enclosed the north end zone in a "bowl" style (see Rose Bowl and Yale Bowl for examples). A net loss of seats in 1987 to accommodate the West Executive Suites construction was more than offset by a student seating adjustment in 1990, increasing capacity to a total of 91,902.

In 1996, the last major expansion was completed with the North Upper Deck to fully enclose the upper level, giving a net gain of 10,642 seats. A 1997 seating adjustment to comply with the Americans with Disabilities Act of 1990 was followed by addition of the East Executive Suites, topping total capacity at 104,037 in 2000.

The addition of the East and West Club Seats in 2006 and 2009, respectively, decreased the total capacity to 100,011. In 2010, the completion of the Tennessee Terrace raised stadium capacity to its current total of 102,455 people.

=== 2004–2010 renovations ===
In 2004, the University of Tennessee implemented the Neyland Stadium Master Plan, a long-term strategy for expanding, renovating, and maintaining the stadium. The plan called for the addition of club seats, widening of concourses, creation of entry plazas, and updates to the stadium's infrastructure. The estimated $200 million renovations, which will be carried out over a series of several phases, are to be funded entirely by private donations and revenue generated from priority and club seats.

Phase I of the master plan, completed in 2006 at a cost of $26 million, involved the addition of the East Club Seats, renovation and widening of the north lower concourse, the addition of LED signage, and the addition of extra restrooms and concessions. The East Club Seats, built on the East Upper Deck, includes 422 seats and an adjoining club room overlooking the Tennessee River.

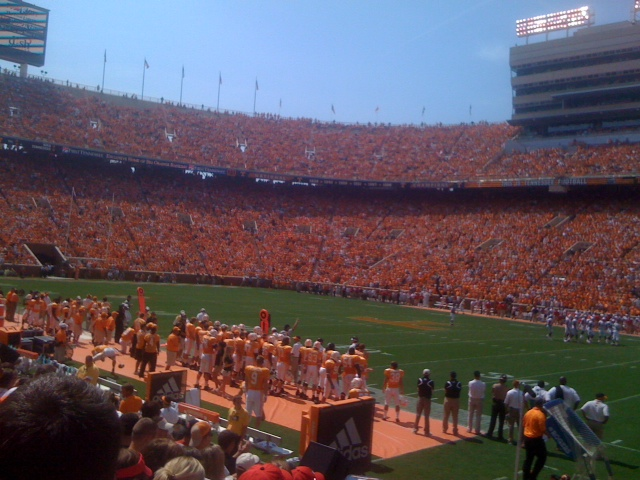
View from the northeast sideline as UT hosted WKU on September 5, 2009

Phase II of the master plan, completed in 2008 at a cost of $27.4 million, involved the renovation and widening of the west lower concourse, renovations to the Peyton Manning Locker Complex and the concourse connecting it with Shields–Watkins Field, and the construction of the Lauricella Center for Letter Winners and the Stokely Family Media Room. The Lauricella Center for Letter Winners, named for Vol All American running back Hank Lauricella, sits adjacent to the locker complex, and provides a gathering area for athletes, coaches, and their family members. The Stokely Family Media Room provides a setting for press conferences and coach and player interviews.

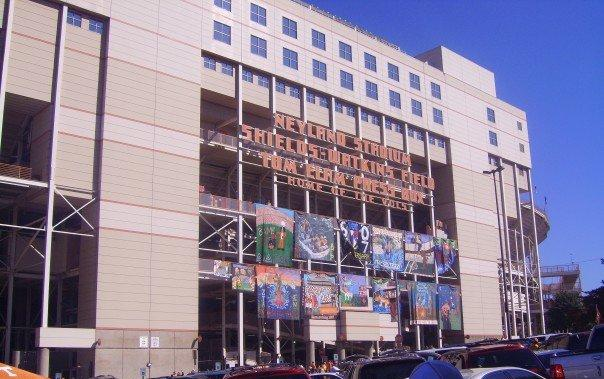
Neyland Stadium at homecoming, prior to Phase III renovations in 2010

Phase III of the master plan, completed in 2010 at a cost of $83 million, included the construction of the West Club Seats, improvements to the Executive Suites and press box, renovations to the west top level concourse, the addition of elevators and stairwells to the West Side, the creation of the Gate 21 Plaza and other entry plazas, the construction of the Tennessee Terrace, and the installation of a statue of General Neyland, created by sculptor Blair Buswell, to the west entrance. The West Club Seats are similar to the East Club Seats, with 422 seats and an adjoining club room. The Tennessee Terrace features 1,782 priority seats, with an adjacent climate-controlled concourse area, overlooking the west sideline.

Phases IV and V will involve renovation of the south and east concourses and the creation of an entry plaza at Gate 10.

== Shields–Watkins Field ==
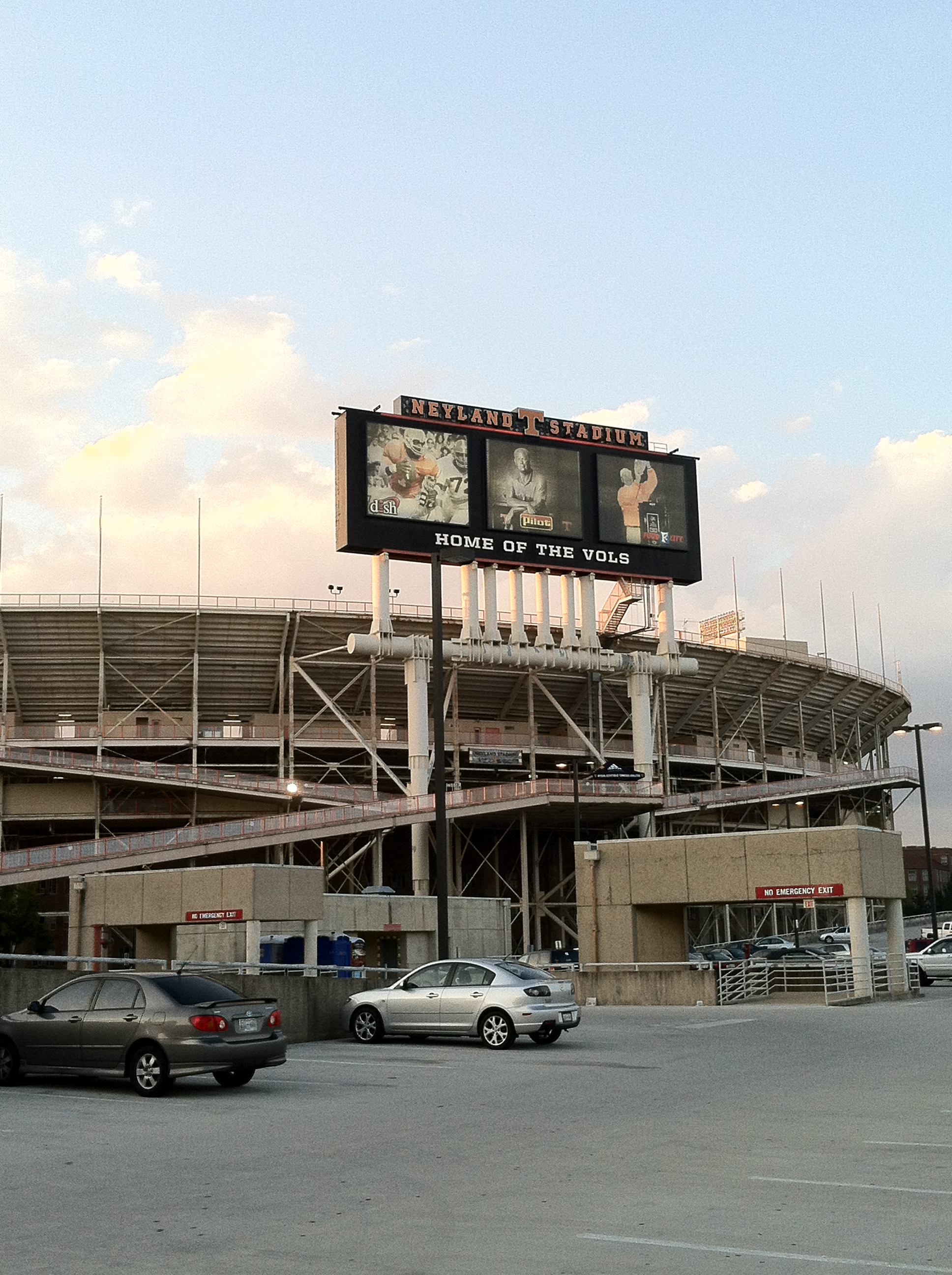
South side of Neyland Stadium as the sun sets

From 1921 to the end of the 1967 season, the field surface was natural grass. In 1964, the orange-and-white checkerboard end zones were added. This was one of the many changes initiated by new head coach Doug Dickey, who also added the "T" logo to the football helmet and initiated the tradition of the team running onto the field through the "Power T" formed by the Pride of the Southland Band, and moved the Tennessee bench from the east side line to the west side line.

In 1968, coinciding with the addition of the East Upper Deck, Tennessee-Turf (TartanTurf-3M) was installed as the playing surface, in part to provide better drainage following heavy rains. The checkerboard end zones were initially not included as part of the Tennessee-Turf playing surface. End zone designs used through the years on the artificial surface included having TENNESSEE and VOLUNTEERS in orange turf lettering and the end zone green turf. The end zones, as well as the midfield logo, were unique in that they were separate pieces of contrasting turf rather than painted turf. The artificial surface, as many from this era, was blamed for excessive leg injuries. In 1989, the orange-and-white checkerboard end zone patterns were restored, and an interlocking "UT" was placed at midfield.

The artificial surface was used through the 1993 season, the last game on the surface being a 62–14 win over Vanderbilt. Afterwards the surface was ripped up and sections were auctioned off to raise funds for the university. The turf was replaced with natural grass the following year, with the checkerboard end zones and midfield logo retained. In 1998, the interlocking "UT" was replaced with the same Power T logo as seen on the football helmets. Since 2007, the entire surface gets re-sodded annually with Tifway Bermuda grass, which rests on a 12-inch bed of sand to enhance drainage.

== Gallery ==
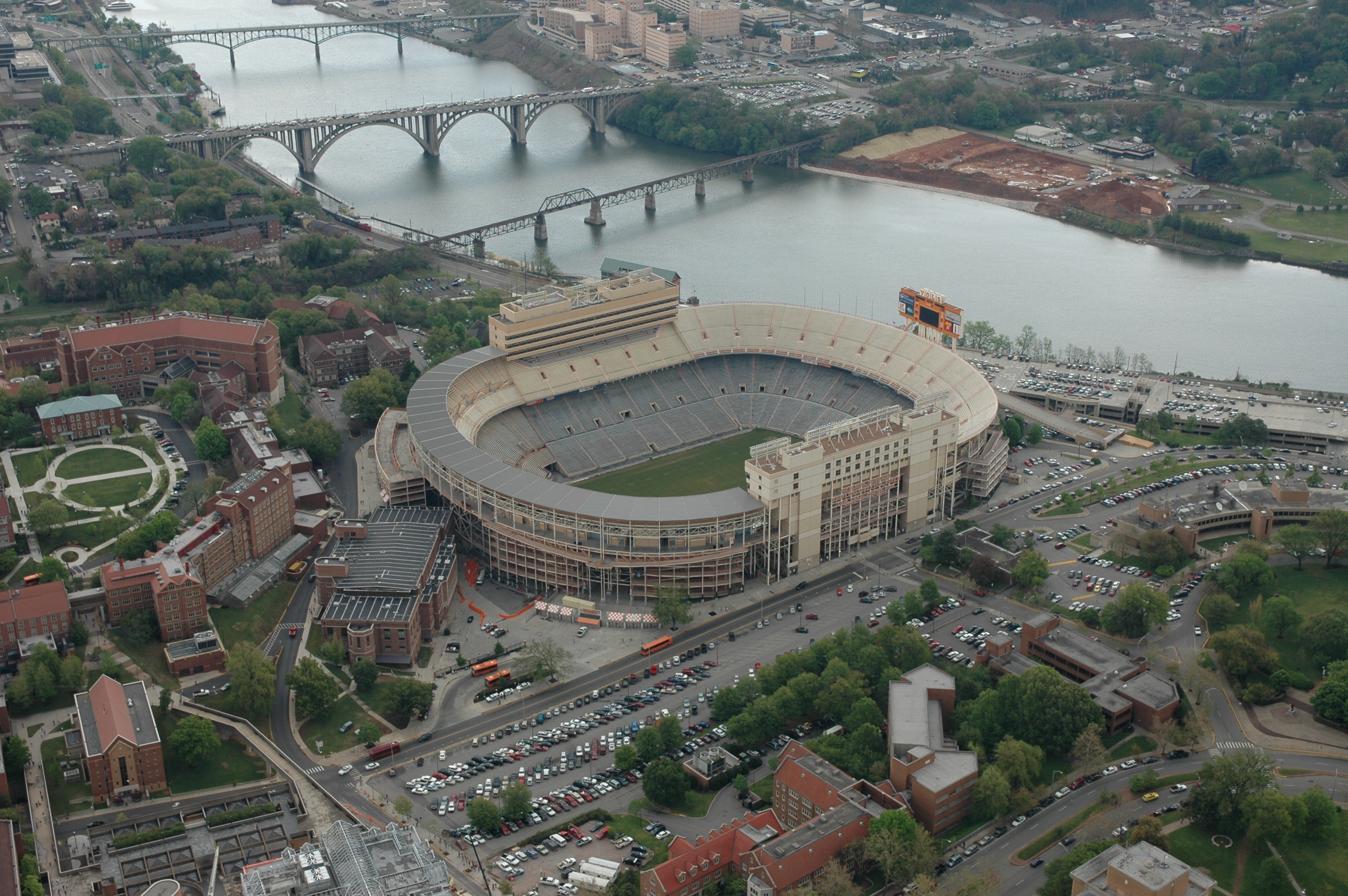
Pre-renovation aerial view, including part of UT campus, Henley Street Bridge, Gay Street Bridge, and the Tennessee River

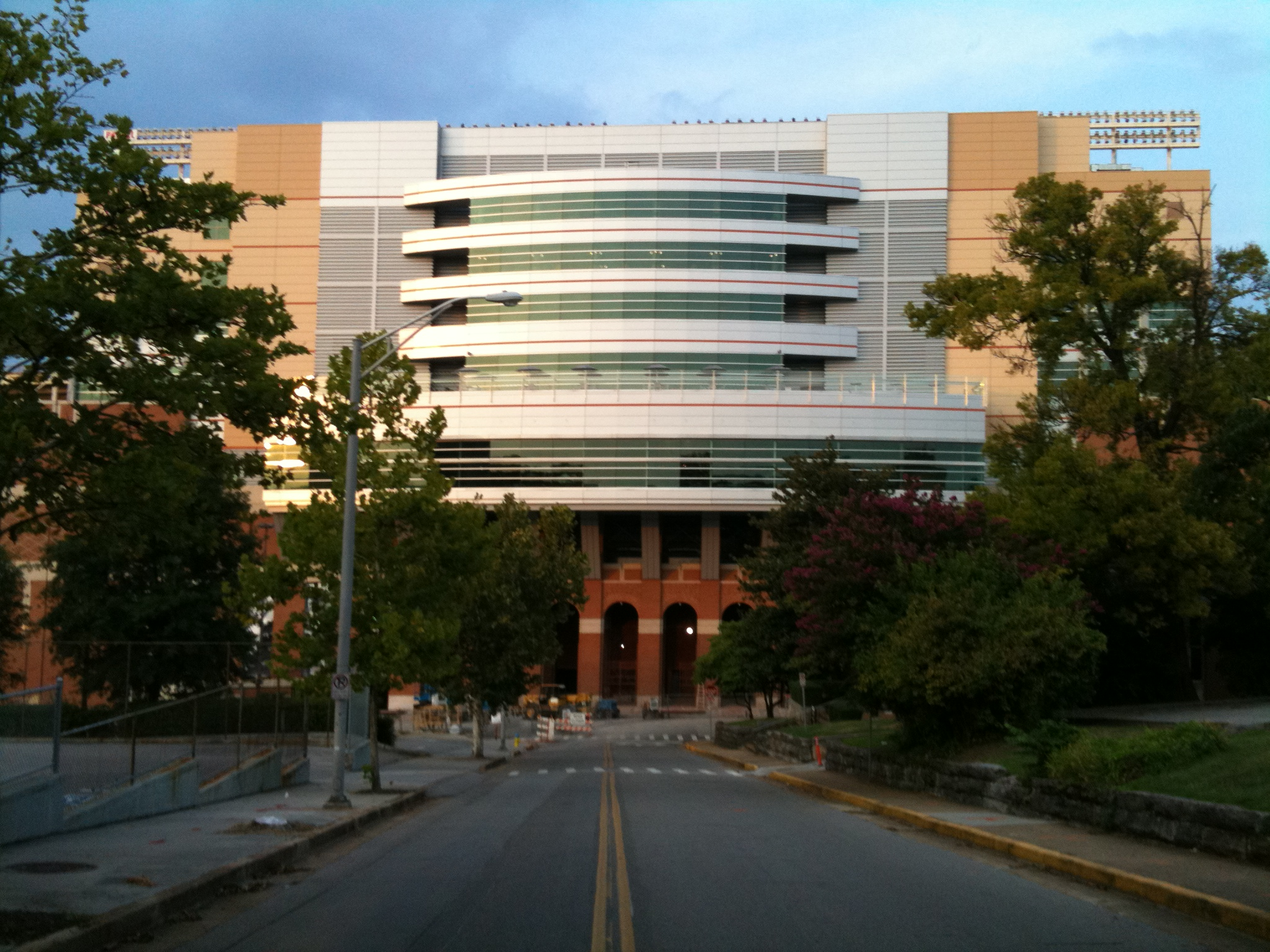
West Side tower as viewed from Peyton Manning Pass, near the completion of Phase III renovations

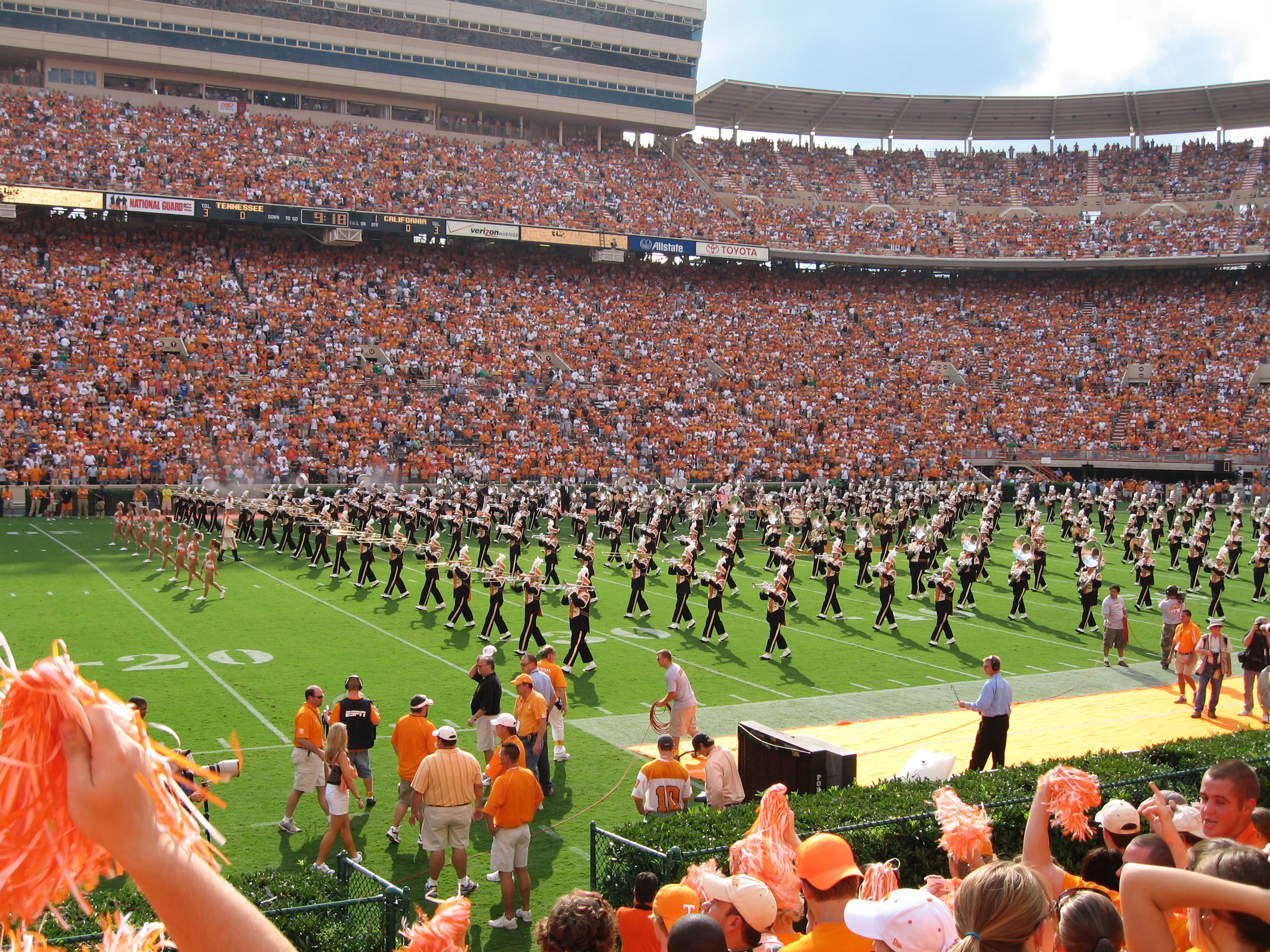
View from the East Stands of the Pride of the Southland Marching Band's famous pregame show

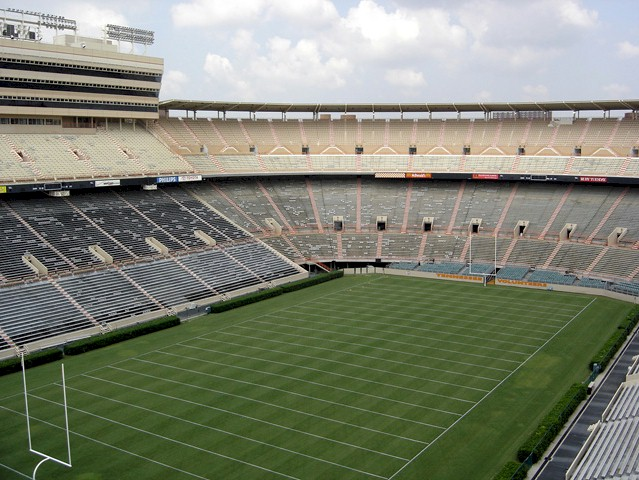
Empty Neyland Stadium, viewed from the Southeast Upper Deck

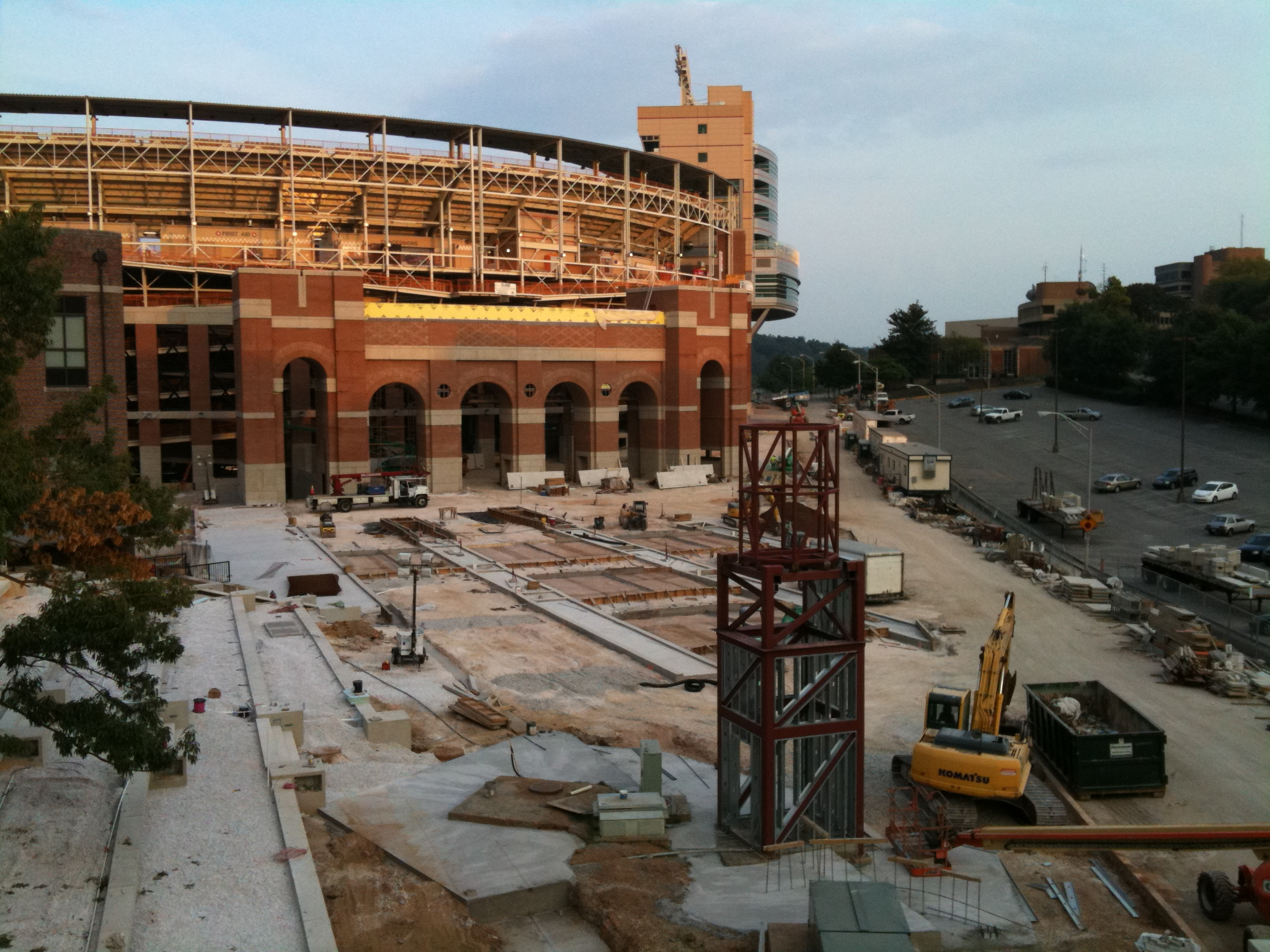
Construction of Gate 21 Plaza, the northwest entrance

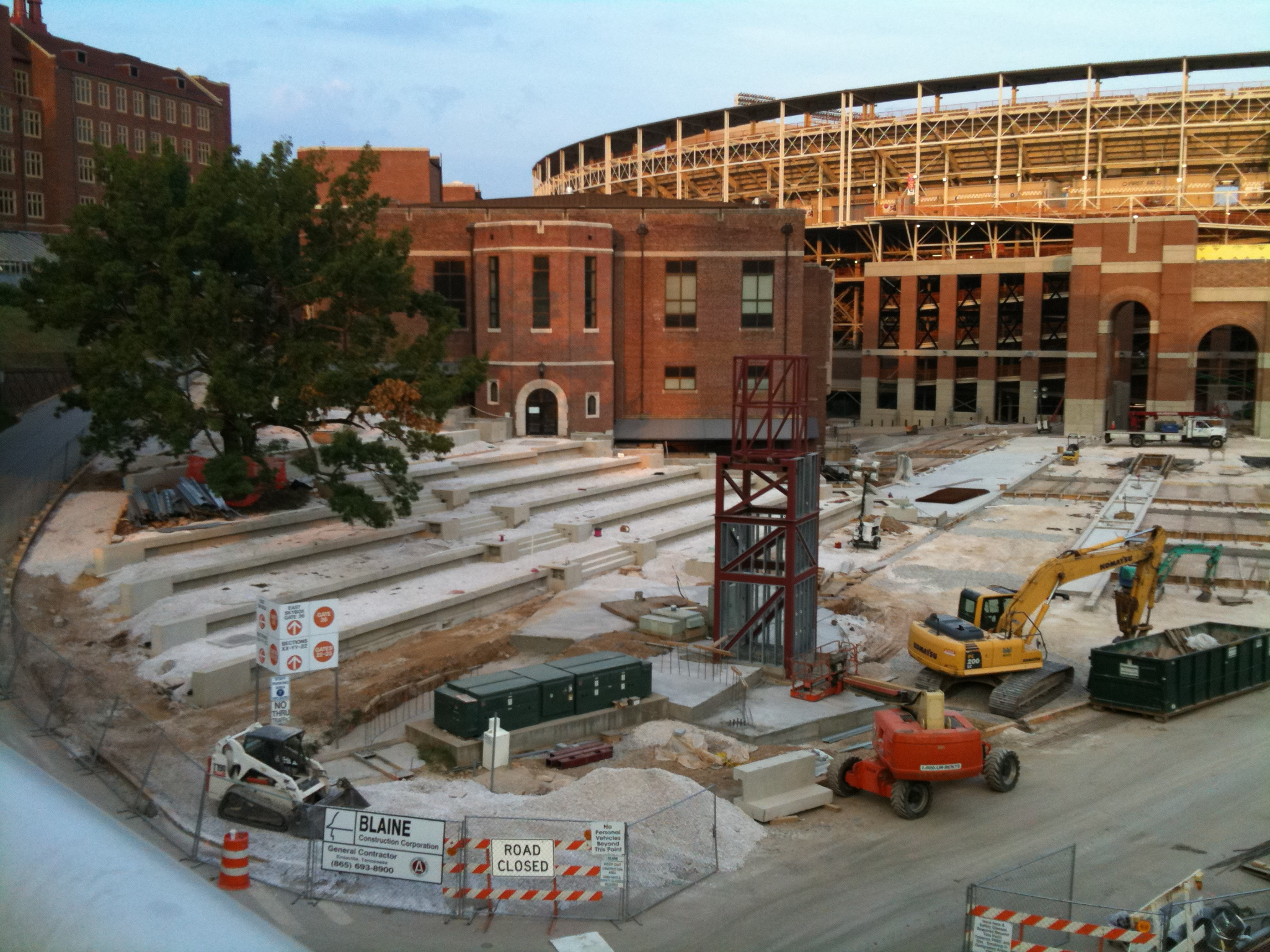
Construction of the amphitheater next to Alumni Memorial Building

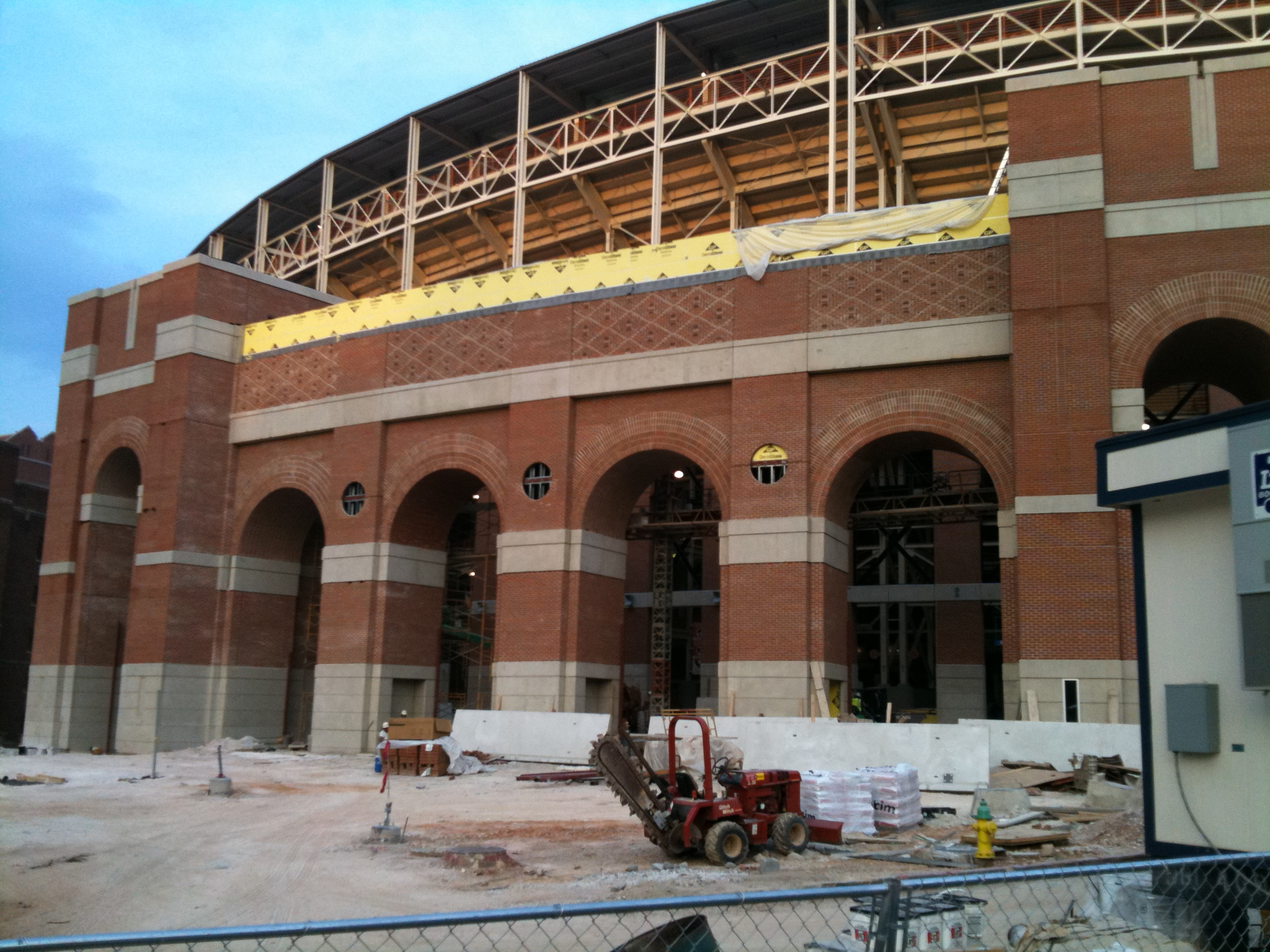
Ground view, Gate 21 Plaza construction

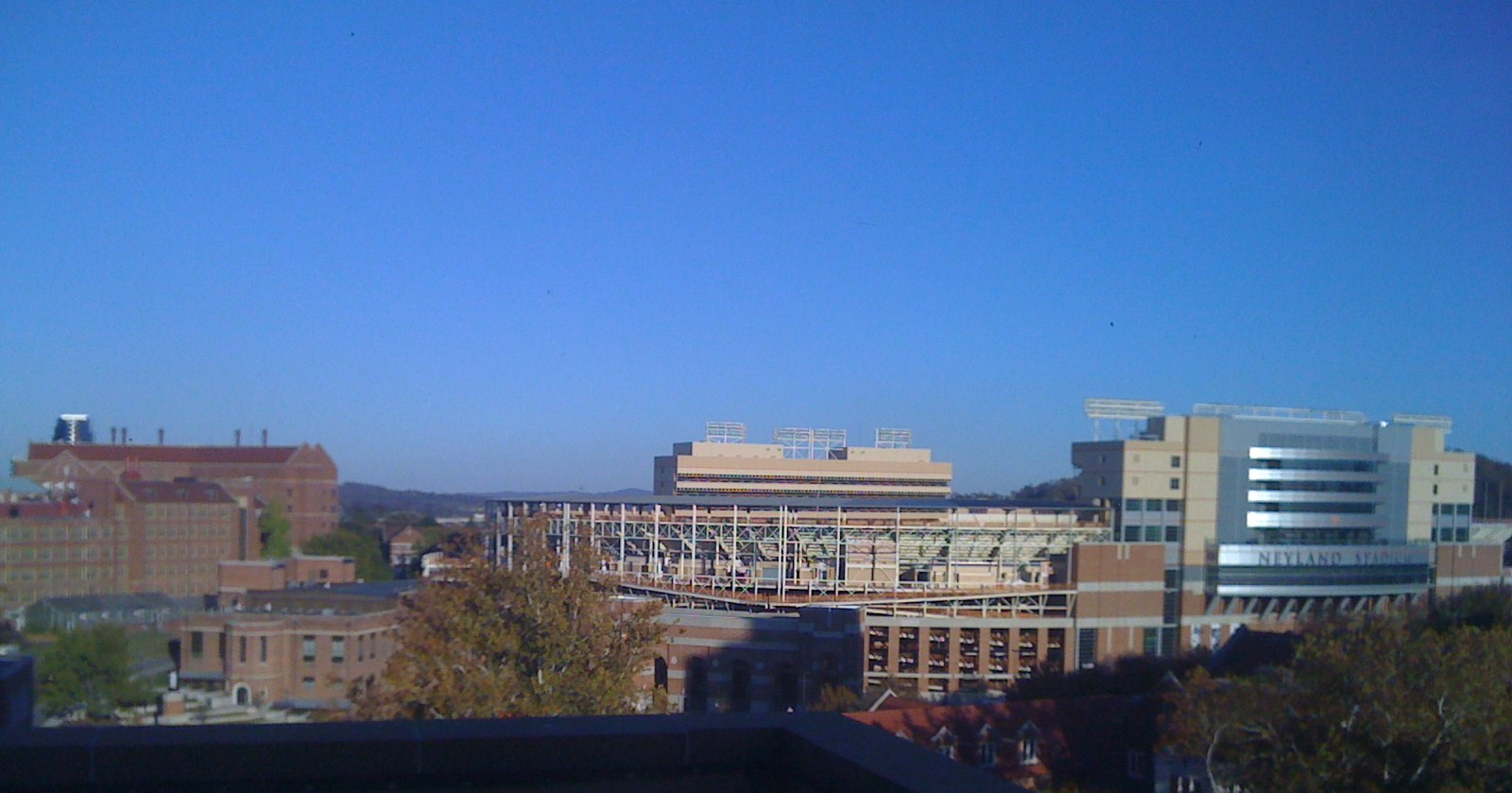
Aerial view from John C. Hodges Library

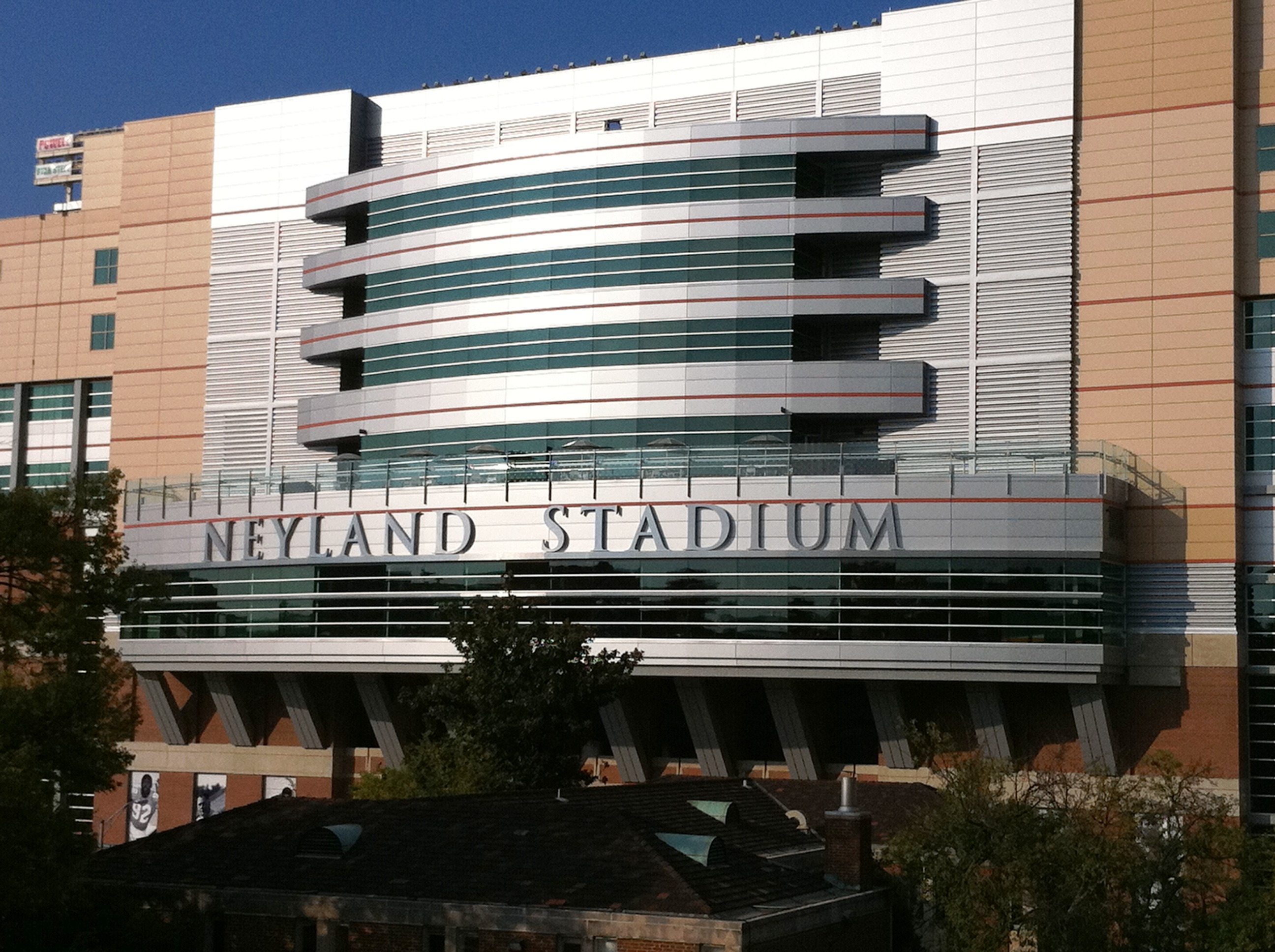
Elevated view of the completed West Side

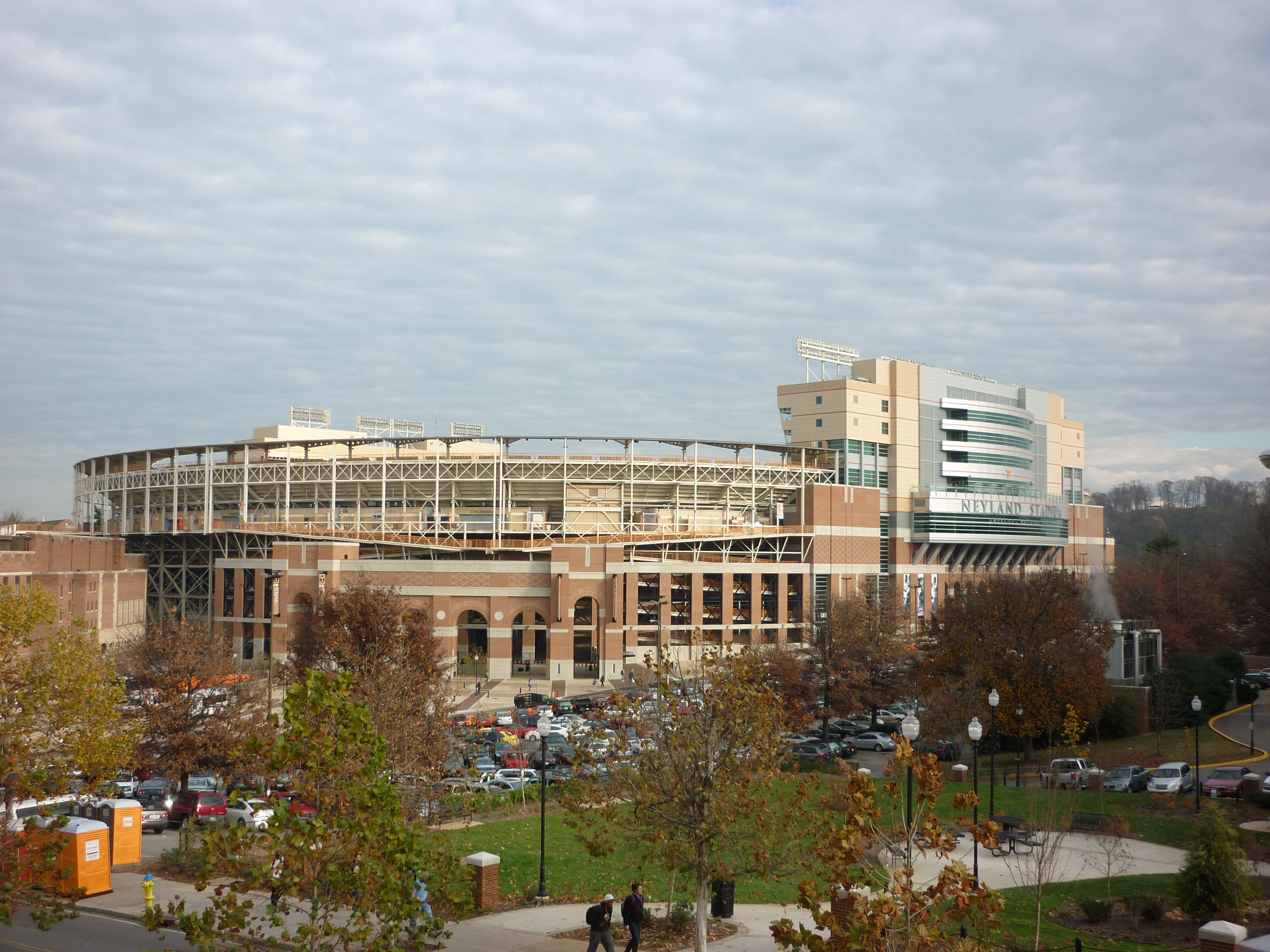
View from campus of the new Gate 21 Plaza and the West Side tower

Statue of Robert Neyland

== See also ==
- List of NCAA Division I FBS football stadiums
- Lists of stadiums
