= William Prows =

American Mormon leader

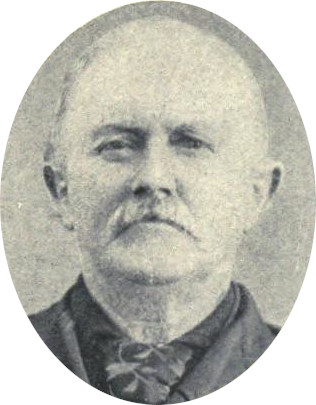
- Born: June 11, 1827
- Died: May 23, 1894 (aged 66); Colonia Juárez, Mexico
- Known for: Reputed discoverer of gold from the Comstock Lode

William Cook Prows (or Prouse) (June 11, 1827 – May 23, 1894) was an early Mormon leader and American settler who may have been the first man to discover gold on the Comstock Lode, leading to a rush of mining in the area during the mid-19th century.

== Biography ==
Prows was born in the upper part of the Kanawha Valley, Virginia (now part of West Virginia). His father was Thomas Prows III, the son of an American Revolutionary War veteran. William Prows' mother was Eleanor Kountz, a descendant of an 18th-century Dutch immigrant to colonial America. William Prows had New England roots and was a descendant of Captain Thomas Pickering, an early leader of Portsmouth, New Hampshire and through his paternal grandmother, the Lowell family of Massachusetts.

In 1829, Prows' parents moved the family to Fulton, Morrow County, Ohio (near present-day Cincinnati), and then in 1831, to Dearborn, Indiana. It was in Indiana that the Prows family became acquainted with Mormonism in the late 1830s. The Prows family desired to move to Nauvoo, Illinois, where Prows, along with his parents and some siblings, joined the Church of Jesus Christ of Latter Day Saints in 1841. A year later, his mother Eleanor died in 1842. Two months after her death, his grieving father Thomas married Charity Arms, a fellow Mormon, who provided a mother figure for William's younger siblings, the youngest of which was aged one when his mother died. William and his family experienced the troubles faced by the Mormons in Nauvoo from 1842 to 1846. William's father left Mormonism in 1846, but his stepmother Charity Arms decided to stay and move west with the rest of the Mormons. Nineteen-year-old William stayed too and promised to support his stepmother for the trek across the Great Plains to Utah. National events, though, intervened and prevented Prows from keeping part of this promise.

The United States was at war with Mexico and in need of men. In July 1846, military leaders in Washington, D.C. asked the Mormons who had just fled Nauvoo—and had been rebuffed by the federal government when they sought protection and redress for persecution against them—to provide a volunteer battalion to assist with the war efforts for the Mexican–American War. Brigham Young, who was the de facto Mormon leader, agreed to provide a battalion. The enlistees were paid $42 for a uniform allowance. William saw this as an opportunity to earn money to provide for his stepmother for her trek to Utah. He wouldn't accompany her to Utah but she would have money to help prepare for the trek. Prows enlisted in the battalion that became known as the Mormon Battalion. The Mormon Battalion holds two distinctions in U.S. military history—(1) it is the only religiously based unit in U.S. military history; and (2) it holds the record for the longest march in U.S. military history. Prows served in Company B. The Battalion marched from the banks of the Missouri River in eastern Nebraska to San Diego, California, and on to Los Angeles, California. After one year of service, Prows was discharged in Los Angeles, California, in July 1847. The Mormon Battalion never faced a battle during its service in the Mexican–American War.

After being discharged, Prows, along with other Mormon Battalion veterans, traveled up to present-day Sacramento, California. In 1848, while working at Sutter's Mill on the American River, Prows was among the group of Mormon Battalion veterans that discovered the gold that sparked the California Gold Rush. Shortly thereafter, Prows left California for Utah. During his trek to Utah, Prows reportedly was the first man to wash gold on the Comstock Lode. The other principal candidate for discovering the Comstock Lode is Abner Blackburn.

Prows married Lodesky Roberds in 1851 and returned to California to take part in the Gold Rush. He and three of his brothers accumulated $15,000 each from gold mining by 1857. They decided to move to Sonoma County, California, and set up a brood sow business. The business failed and they lost their wealth. Prows decided to return to Utah to be around other Mormons and live his religion.

Back in Utah, Prows become an early Utah Mormon leader and was among the founders of Fillmore, Utah. In 1868, Prows became a polygamist and married his second wife, Louisa Rowena James, a part-Cherokee woman who had joined the church with her parents years earlier. Prows, a cooper by trade like his father and grandfather, made his living primarily through farming and livestock. He lived in Kanosh, Utah during the latter part of his life. In 1889, he was jailed for 65 days for unlawful cohabitation for practicing polygamy. After his release, he decided to move his family to Colonia Juárez, Chihuahua, Mexico, a colony founded by Mormons seeking to avoid prosecution for practicing polygamy. Prows arrived in Mexico with his families in 1894. Shortly after his arrival, he became ill and died in Colonia Juárez on May 23, 1894.
