= Capture of Tucson (1846) =

Part of the Mexican–American War

- Part of the Mexican–American War
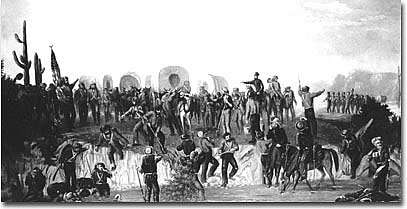
- The Mormon Battalion at the Gila River (Gila Bend, AZ) by George M. Ottinger.
Date	December 16, 1846
Location	Tucson, Sonora; Modern Day: Tucson, Arizona
Result	United States victory

Belligerents
United States	Mexico

Commanders and leaders
(United States) Philip St. George Cooke	(Mexico) Antonio Comaduran

Strength
360	200

The Capture of Tucson was an uncontested United States entry into the Mexican city of Tucson, Sonora, now the present day Tucson, Arizona. The would-be combatants were provisional Mexican Army troops and the American Army's "Mormon Battalion". Tucson temporarily 'fell' in December 1846 without resistance but was immediately reoccupied two days later by the Mexican forces once the US troops moved on.

== Capture ==
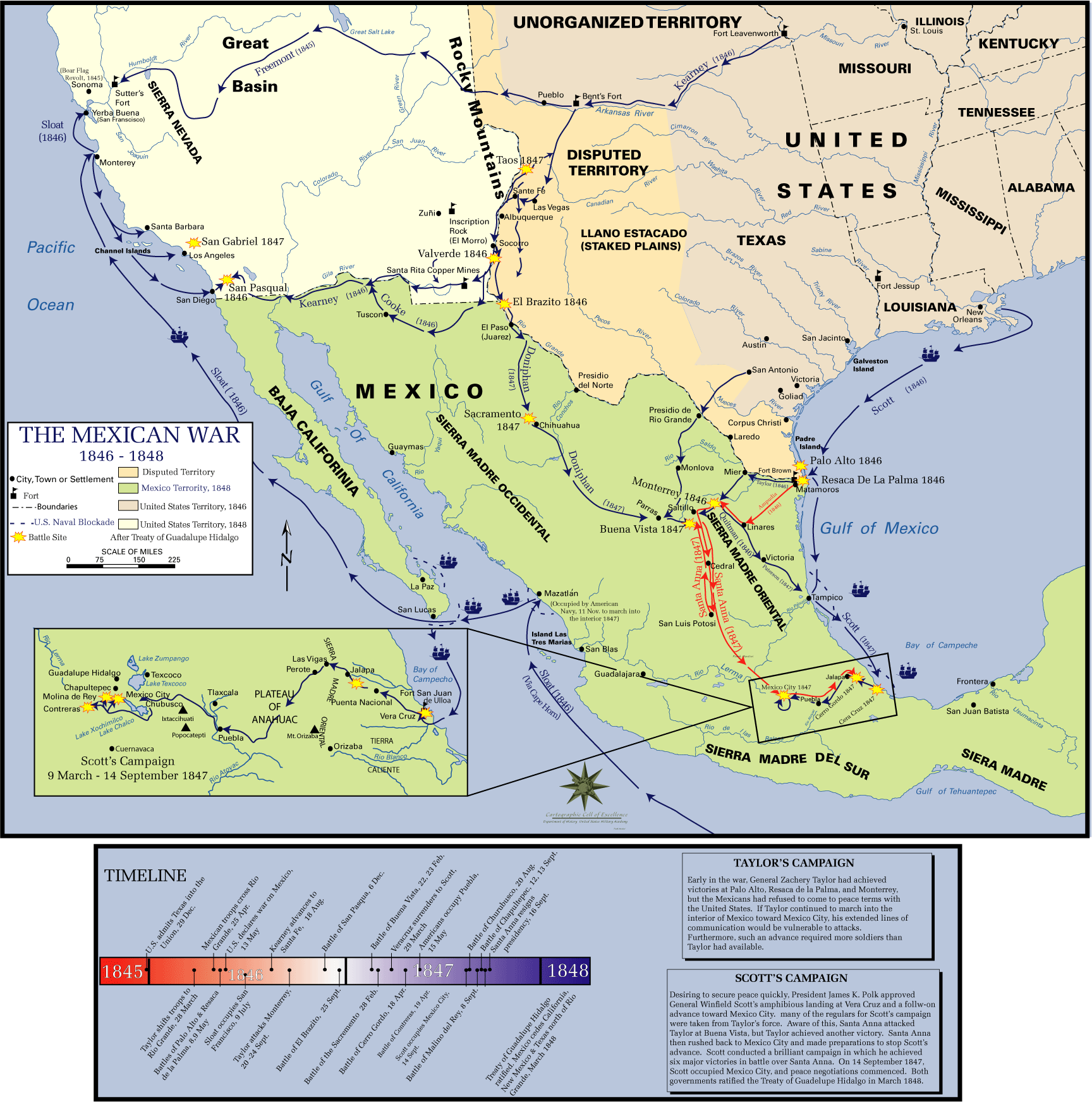
The Mexican War overview map.

The Mexican–American War began after Thornton's Defeat in 1846. This same year a battalion of Mormon men was recruited by the United States Army in western Iowa and dispatched with General Steven Watts Kearny's "Army of the West" across what they considered the "Great Western Desert". The mission assigned to the Mormon Battalion was to create a continuous wagon road from Santa Fe to San Diego—the first into southern California.

The American force, of around 499 riflemen and officers, were commanded by Lieutenant Colonel Philip St. George Cooke. Only an effective force of 360 took part in the trek across the Arizona desert. Previously, about 150 physically unfit men and some eighty-four women and children family members trailing the Battalion towards Santa Fe had been sent to the trapper/trader compound 'el pueblo' (modern Pueblo Colorado) on the Arkansas River.

Marching towards Tucson in November 1846, the Mormon Battalion fought their only battle and it was against wild cattle which attacked them near the San Pedro River. After the "Battle of the Bulls", as it is humorously known, the force turned west towards Tucson, where it seemed they might have to really fight the Mexican garrison of Fort Tucson, a former Spanish presidio.

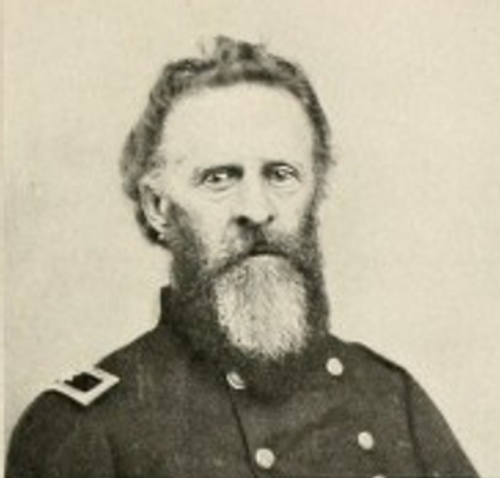
Philip Cooke in his general's uniform during the American Civil War.

The Mexican force consisted of around 200 men, most likely infantry and cavalry plus two small brass cannons, as well as an unknown force of men from the garrisons of Tubac, Santa Cruz and Fronteras.

The Mexican Captain Antonio Comaduran had received about three days warning of the approaching Americans. Following an exchange of information between the two commanders and parlays regarding safe passage on the 100-mile shorter and easier route through Tucson, Comaduran refused permission to the US Army to enter Tucson, much less would he agree to surrender the presidio. Each side took token prisoners, then released them as tokens of good faith. Tensions were running high and getting higher as Cooke's force approached.

Realizing he was outnumbered, Captain Comaduran decided to withdraw without fighting. He also advised many civilians to abandon Tucson with him. The Mexican forces retreated to San Xavier about 8 1/2 miles southwest of Tucson. On December 16, 1846, the US Army unit arrived at the south end of Tucson and prepared to enter the town. Even though the muskets were loaded and bayonets affixed, Col Cooke paused to remind his troops of his Order No 19, given 13 December:

"We came not to make war against Sonora, and less still to destroy an unimportant outpost of defense against Indians. But we will take the straight course before us and overcome all resistance. But, shall I remind you that the American soldier ever shows justice and kindness to the unarmed and unresisting; the property of individuals you will hold sacred - the people of Sonora are not our enemies."

No fighting occurred as the small army entered Tucson, passed along the west wall of the Mexican military compound, then camped a half-mile north of town on a small flowing creek. The Americans began to assure the frightened and staring population of their friendly intentions. Many of the Mormon men were interested in trading for food and clothing. One man related later that a twenty-eight star American flag temporarily flew over Tucson for the first time though neither Cooke nor any other journalist makes any mention of it.

"The author (Sgt. Daniel Tyler) remembers, with much gratitude, the silver-haired Mexican, of perhaps more than three score years and ten, who, when signs of thirst were given, ran to the brook ..., dipped up his water, and ... with cheerful countenance, delivered the refreshing and much needed draught. He has doubtless, long since, been gathered to his fathers; if so, peace to his ashes. Surely, 'I was athirst, and he gave me drink.'"

Lieutenant Colonel Cooke's soldiers had been low on food, so the Mexicans bartered meat and bread for cloth, buttons and pins, but only a little food was transferred to the Mormons through trade. Cooke estimated about 1,500 bushels of wheat grain had been left behind by the Mexican garrison as 'public' (government) property. Cooke ordered 25 bushels of this confiscated for his command's wagon mules and two quarts as food for every three soldiers. All told, Cooke appropriated about 30 bushels of wheat—about 2% of the Mexican 'public' wheat stores. None was taken from private families. Tyler goes on to relate that, "Quinces and semi-tropical fruits were also purchased here, as well as beans, corn, etc."

On 17 December, Cooke determined to make an expedition to the Catholic Indian Mission San Xavier del Bac with about 50 armed men, but they were spotted, prompting the Mexican Army to retreat further south towards the Tubac presidio to avoid an unnecessary fight. That night, some of the sentries created a temporary excitement by signaling that Mexican troops were attempting to attack. Within the hour it was determined to be a false alarm and most of the men tried to get a little more rest.

The morning of the 18th, Cooke ended their temporary occupation and continued his march towards the next settlement, the Pima Villages, 75 miles distant across a nearly water-less flat plain. The Mexican forces and inhabitants returned to their unmolested and undespoiled city. Tucson, with about 400-500 inhabitants in 1846, would officially become an American community ten years later in 1856, following the Gadsden Purchase.

== See also ==
- History of Tucson, Arizona
- List of battles of the Mexican–American War
- List of conflicts in the United States
