= Edward J. Fraughton =

Edward James Fraughton
- Self-portrait
- Born: March 22, 1939; Park City, Utah, U.S.
- Died: June 2, 2024 (aged 85); South Jordan, Utah, U.S.
- Resting place: Larkin Sunset Gardens, Sandy, Utah
- Education: University of Utah
- Known for: Sculpture, Inventor

Edward James Fraughton (March 22, 1939 – June 2, 2024) was an American artist, sculptor, and inventor. He is primarily known for his works and individual collector editions related to the history of the American West. A literal sculptor with an academic background in design and human anatomy, Fraughton's versatility covers a broad spectrum of human and animal subjects.

Fraughton died on June 2, 2024, at the age of 85.

== Education ==
Fraughton attended Marsac Elementary School and in 1957 graduated from Park City High School. Entering the University of Utah as a civil engineering student, Fraughton later changed his major to sculpture and graduated in 1962 with a Bachelor of Fine Arts (BFA) degree. While there, he studied, served as a student teaching assistant, assisted in the gross anatomy lab and did his post graduate work under the legendary Dr. Avard Fairbanks and his son, Justin. He also played baritone horn in the university marching and concert bands.

== Professional career ==
Following his formal education, which he largely financed by working night shifts at local steel fabrication plant, Fraughton struggled to make ends meet by working in sales, serving as a substitute high school teacher, driving truck as a delivery boy, and laboring as a foundry worker in a local bronze casting facility. In 1966, he was hired by Thiokol Chemical Corporation to apply his artistic training at the newly opened Job Corps Center in Clearfield, Utah. Managed by the Office of Economic Opportunity (OEO), Job Corps was an initiative launched by the Lyndon B. Johnson administration to fight the War on Poverty. After the first year of operations, on August 22, 1967, Fraughton received a letter from W. C. Hearnton, assistant director of avocational training, stating in part:

For nearly three months after reporting for work here at Clearfield, he [referring to Fraughton] was the only member of the Arts and Crafts Department. During this three-month period, he wrote and secured OEO approval for the curriculum that we are now offering to our Corpsmen population.

Out of the one hundred and fifty (150) Job Corps Centers located throughout the United States, our program is viewed by OEO as the best in existence. In no small measure, the success of our program can be attributed to the professional competence and know-how of Mr. Fraughton.

Resigning from the Job Corps in 1967 to launch his full-time career as a professional sculptor, Fraughton's first sculpture commission involved creating a series of historical portraits for the Church of Jesus Christ of Latter-day Saints. In 1968, he was commissioned by the Sons of Utah Pioneers and Mormon Battalion associations to create a heroic monument commemorating the Mormon Battalion's trek from Fort Leavenworth, Kansas, to San Diego during the 1846–1847 Mexican–American War. His 12-foot Mormon Battalion Soldier stands at the highest point in San Diego's Presidio Park.

National recognition began to mount in 1973 when Fraughton was awarded his first gold medal at the National Academy of Western Art for his sculpture entitled, Where Trails End. Awards from the National Sculpture Society, National Academy of Design and other prestigious art organizations soon followed. In 1980, Fraughton was selected to create the inaugural medal for President Ronald Reagan. During his eight years in office, a copy of Where Trails End was exhibited in President Reagan's private office in the White House. The same piece is now on permanent display at the Reagan Presidential Library in Simi Valley, California.

Fraughton's stylistic goals follow the American Neo-classic/Beaux-Arts, impressionistic realism traditions of J. Q. A. Ward, Henry Shrady, James Earle Fraser, Hermon Atkins MacNeil, Daniel Chester French, Augustus Saint Gaudens, Cyrus Dallin, Gutzon and Solon Borglum, and American animaliers Edward Kemeys and Phimister Proctor.

== Recent sculpture projects ==
One of Fraughton's most recent works involves a ten-year collaborative effort with fellow sculptors, Kent Ullberg and Blair Buswell. Commissioned by the First National Bank of Omaha, the heroic bronze installation titled, Nebraska Wilderness and Pioneer Courage, depicts an American pioneer wagon train moving west through Nebraska's wilderness during the mid-19th century. Encountering a herd of wild American bison, the animals quickly turn and run through the city streets toward the bank's new 40-story office building. As the buffalo approach an elevated pond and fountain facing the building's front entrance, a flock of Canada geese explode from the water, fly around the surrounding air space and through the windows of a glassed-in atrium housing the building's historic facade. The geese slowly morph from traditional bronze into modern polished stainless steel as they enter the building. The artistic effect and integration of all elements create a unique and startling effect in the world of contemporary realist sculpture. This project is the largest single installation of monumental sculpture in North America, the linear space covering an area of approximately five city blocks.

Another more recently completed monument depicts an ancient ancestral rock-climbing Puebloan Indian descending a sheer narrow column of sandstone with a basket of corn. Indicative of the ancient cliff-dweller culture of the American Southwest, the twenty-foot high monument graces the new visitor center and museum entrance of Mesa Verde National Park near Cortez, Colorado.

== Inventor ==
Following a mid-air collision over the Salt Lake Valley in 1987 that destroyed two airplanes and claimed ten lives, Fraughton, a pilot, invented and patented a new technology for tracking aircraft. This technology, now most popularly known as ADS-B, uses GPS satellite tracking to find and report aircraft positions. Fraughton's U.S. patent, (number 5,153,836) and foreign patents were issued in 1992. Subsequently, he served on several committees associated with the Federal Aviation Administration (FAA), most notably the original ADS committee and Special Committee 186 of the Radio Technical Commission for Aeronautics. ADS-B has recently been announced as the FAA's system of choice to upgrade and replace the outdated radar based air traffic control technology.

In the field of sculpture, Fraughton has developed an improved method for enlarging his sculpture into monumental scale. Using digital imaging and CNC cutting, his technique allows positive clay components to be produced to any scale with greater integrity, thus improving efficiency during the direct modeling stage.

== Public service ==
- Park City, Utah, Planning Commission, 1962–1963
- South Jordan Planning Commission, 1977–1985
- Jordan River Advisory Counsel, 1980
- National Sculpture Society Board of Directors, 2002
- White House Fellows Presidents Commission on White House Fellows, Rocky Mountain Region Panel 1981–1988
- Moscow Conference on Law and Bilateral Economic Development, 1991

== Monuments ==
- Cliff-Climber monument representing the ancient Anasazi Indian culture, National Park Service, Mesa Verde National Park, Colorado
- Pioneer Courage Monument, First National Bank of Omaha, Omaha, Nebraska
- John Wayne, National Cowboy and Western Heritage Museum, Oklahoma City, Oklahoma
- Finding the Way, Salt Lake City, Utah
- Jason Rendell portrait, Boston, Massachusetts
- Gandy Dancer, Union Station Museum, Ogden, Utah
- Bitter Strength, Union Station Museum, Ogden, Utah
- The Iron Lady, portrait of Margaret Thatcher, International Gardens, Salt Lake City, Utah
- Clearing the Haul-way, Rock Springs, Wyoming
- The Cadet, Randolph-Macon Academy Front Royal, Virginia
- Monument to Education, Ricks College Rexburg, Idaho
- Spirit of Wyoming, State Capitol, Cheyenne, Wyoming
- Truman Angell, Architect, The Church of Jesus Christ of Latter-day Saints, Salt Lake City, Utah
- Thomas E. Ricks, Ricks College Rexburg, Idaho
- Winter Quarters. Florence, Nebraska
- All is Well, Songbook/Eliza Snow, William Clayton, and Brigham Young monuments, Brigham Young Cemetery, Salt Lake City, Utah
- Mormon Battalion Monument, Presidio Park, San Diego, California

== Awards ==
- 2010 Henry Hering Memorial Medal, National Sculpture Society, Pioneer Courage Monument
- 2010 Director's Award, Springville Spring Salon, Prairie Lullaby
- 2010 Award Of Excellence, American Society of Landscape Architects, Pioneer Courage Monument
- 2004 People's Choice Award, Prix de West, Home is Where the Heart Is
- 1993 Gold Medal, National Academy of Western Art, The Candidate
- 1992 Silver Medal, National Academy of Western Art, The Taste of Honey
- 1987 Gold Medal, National Academy of Western Art, ... One Nation ...
- 1985 Greenwich Workshop Award, Museum of the Rockies
- 1984 Experience the West Award, Museum of the Rockies
- 1983 Honors in the Arts Award, Salt Lake Area Chamber of Commerce
- 1981 Tallix Foundry Prize, National Sculpture Society, Spirit of Man
- 1981 Artist of the West, San Dimas Festival of Western Arts.
- 1980 Outstanding Utah Artist Award, Snowbird Institute
- 1979 Lance International Prize, National Sculpture Society, Waterlilies
- 1979 Ellin P. Speyer Prize, National Academy of Design, The Last Arrow
- 1977 Gold Medal, National Academy of Western Art, Anasazi
- 1975 Gold Medal, National Academy of Western Art, The Last Farewell
- 1973 Gold Medal, National Academy of Western Art, Where Trails End
- 1949 1st Place, Milton Bradley Company "America the Beautiful" Crayon Art Competition (Utah)

== Gallery ==
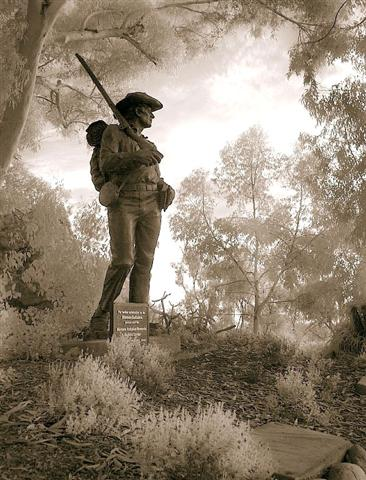
Mormon Battalion Monument Presidio Park, San Diego, California

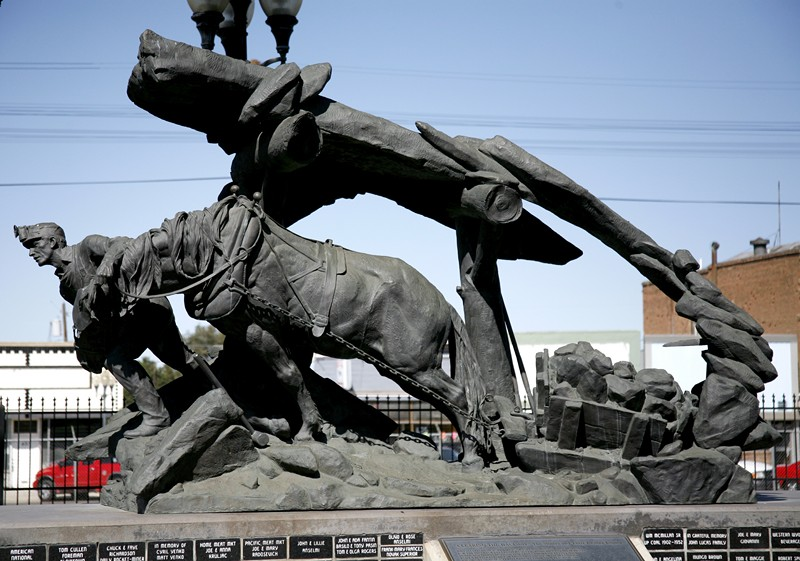
Clearing the Haulway Rock Springs, Wyoming

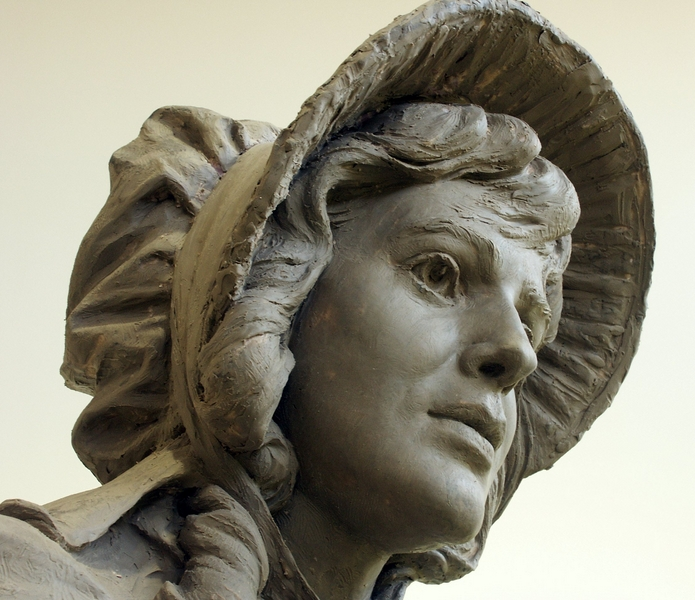
From Dawn 'til Dusk Omaha, Nebraska

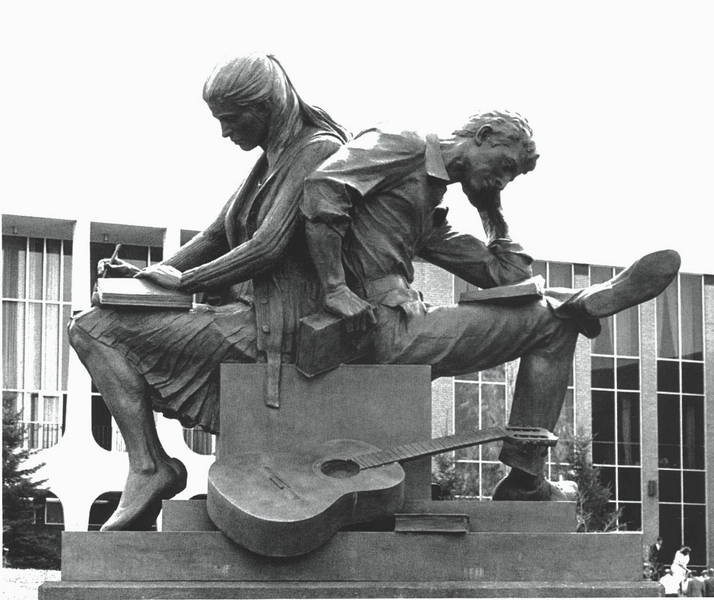
Monument to Education (Study Time) Rexburg, Idaho

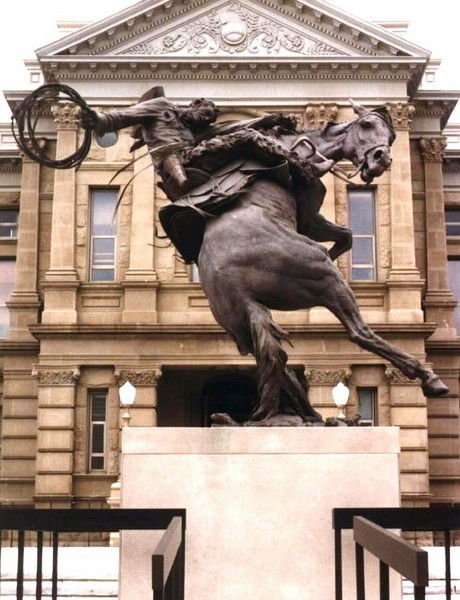
Spirit of Wyoming Cheyenne, Wyoming

== Print and film appearances ==
- Saving America - I – II – III Steps to Saving America, October 2016
- Kindred Spirits II - On the Road to Modernism, 2008
- The Story of Leanin' Tree: Art and Enterprise in the American West, Leanin' Tree, Inc., 2008 ISBN 978-1427399908
- Western Traditions: Contemporary Artists of the American West, Fresco Fine Art Publications, 2005 ISBN 978-0974102344
- Davenport's Art Reference and Price Guide 2006–2007, 2005
- Art of the West, July/August 2002
- Art of the West Guidebook, 2001
- Leading the West, Hagerty, 1997 ISBN 978-0873586009
- Southwest Art, May 1993
- Art of the West, February 6, 1991
- Ricks College Centennial Calendar cover, 1988–1989
- Lodestar, Winter 1988
- Cheyenne, Wyoming, telephone directory cover, 1987
- Frankfurter Allgemeine Zeitung, April 1986
- This People, May 1985
- Profiles in American Art, PBS television series; Ken Meyer, 1982
- Men of Achievement, International Biographical Centre, 1982
- Contemporary Western Artists, Samuels; Southwest Art Publishing, 1982 ISBN 978-0911219005
- Southwest Art, October 1982
- Art of the West, August/September 1982
- The Rotarian, August 1982
- American Artists of Renown, 1981–1982
- Expression Magazine, July 1981
- Treasures of the American West, Harrison Eiteljorg; Balance House, 1981
- Time, December 19, 1980
- U.S. News & World Report, December 22, 1980
- Artists of the Rockies and the Golden West, Spring 1980
- Who's Who in American Art, Bowker, 1976–2004
- Town & Country, January 1977
- Cowboy, Whitney Museum catalog, 1975
- Bronzes of the American West, Patricia Broder; Abrams, 1975
- Persimmon Hill, volumes 3, #3, #4; 5, #4, 1974
