= Doak Walker Award =

American college football award

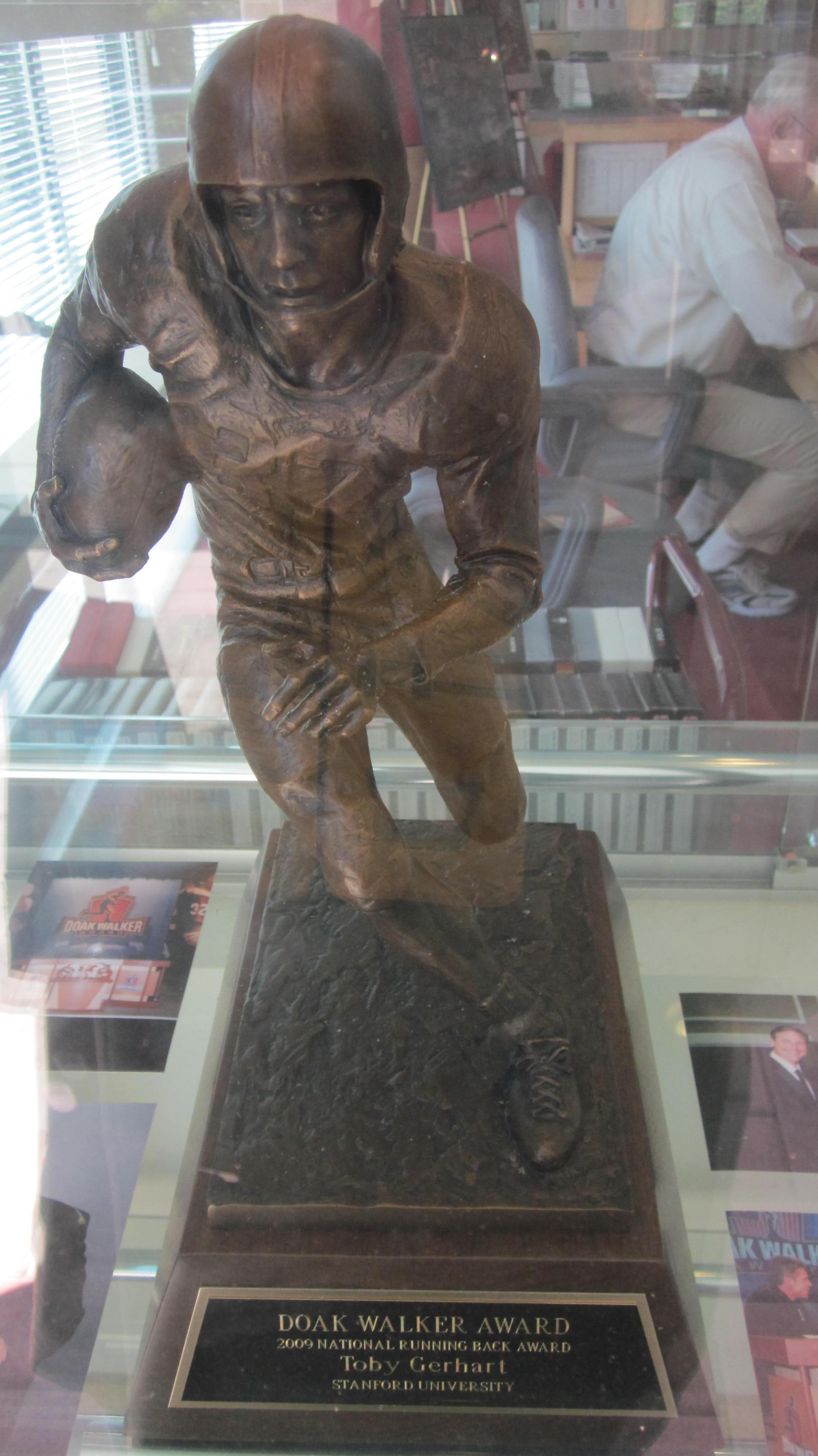
- The Doak Walker Award, designed by artist Blair Buswell
- Awarded for: The nation's top college football running back
- Country: United States
- Presented by: SMU

History
- First award: 1990
- Most recent: Jeremiyah Love, Notre Dame
- Website: www.smu.edu/DoakWalkerAward

The Doak Walker Award honors the top running back in college football in the United States. Established in 1990, it is named in honor of Doak Walker, a former running back who played for the SMU Mustangs from 1945 to 1949 and in the National Football League (NFL) for the Detroit Lions from 1950 to 1955. The player is selected by the award's National Selection Committee, which consists of notable sportswriters, television commentators, analysts, radio sports personalities and former All-America and NFL All-Pro football players. Recipients receive a bronze sculpture of Doak Walker, designed by artist Blair Buswell. The most recent winner of the award was Jeremiyah Love of Notre Dame.

== Notable accomplishments ==
Wisconsin Badgers running backs won four times in eight years from 2012 to 2019. The Badgers and Texas Longhorns are tied with the most wins with five apiece.

Ricky Williams from Texas (1997, 1998), Darren McFadden from the Arkansas Razorbacks (2006, 2007) and Jonathan Taylor from Wisconsin (2018, 2019) are the only three players to win the award twice.

== Winners ==
Made at least one Pro Bowl during NFL career.

Year	Winner	School	Ref.
1990	Greg Lewis	Washington	
1991	Trevor Cobb	Rice	
1992	Garrison Hearst	Georgia	
1993	Bam Morris	Texas Tech	
1994	Rashaan Salaam	Colorado	
1995	Eddie George	Ohio State	
1996	Byron Hanspard	Texas Tech (2)	
1997	Ricky Williams	Texas	
1998	Ricky Williams (2)	Texas (2)	
1999	Ron Dayne	Wisconsin	
2000	LaDainian Tomlinson	TCU	
2001	Luke Staley	BYU	
2002	Larry Johnson	Penn State	
2003	Chris Perry	Michigan	
2004	Cedric Benson	Texas (3)	
2005	Reggie Bush	USC	
2006	Darren McFadden	Arkansas	
2007	Darren McFadden (2)	Arkansas (2)	
2008	Shonn Greene	Iowa	
2009	Toby Gerhart	Stanford	
2010	LaMichael James	Oregon	
2011	Trent Richardson	Alabama	
2012	Montee Ball	Wisconsin (2)	
2013	Andre Williams	Boston College	
2014	Melvin Gordon	Wisconsin (3)	
2015	Derrick Henry	Alabama (2)	
2016	D'Onta Foreman	Texas (4)	
2017	Bryce Love	Stanford (2)	
2018	Jonathan Taylor	Wisconsin (4)	
2019	Jonathan Taylor (2)	Wisconsin (5)	
2020	Najee Harris	Alabama (3)	
2021	Kenneth Walker III	Michigan State	
2022	Bijan Robinson	Texas (5)	
2023	Ollie Gordon II	Oklahoma State	
2024	Ashton Jeanty	Boise State	
2025	Jeremiyah Love	Notre Dame	
