= Mormon Battalion =

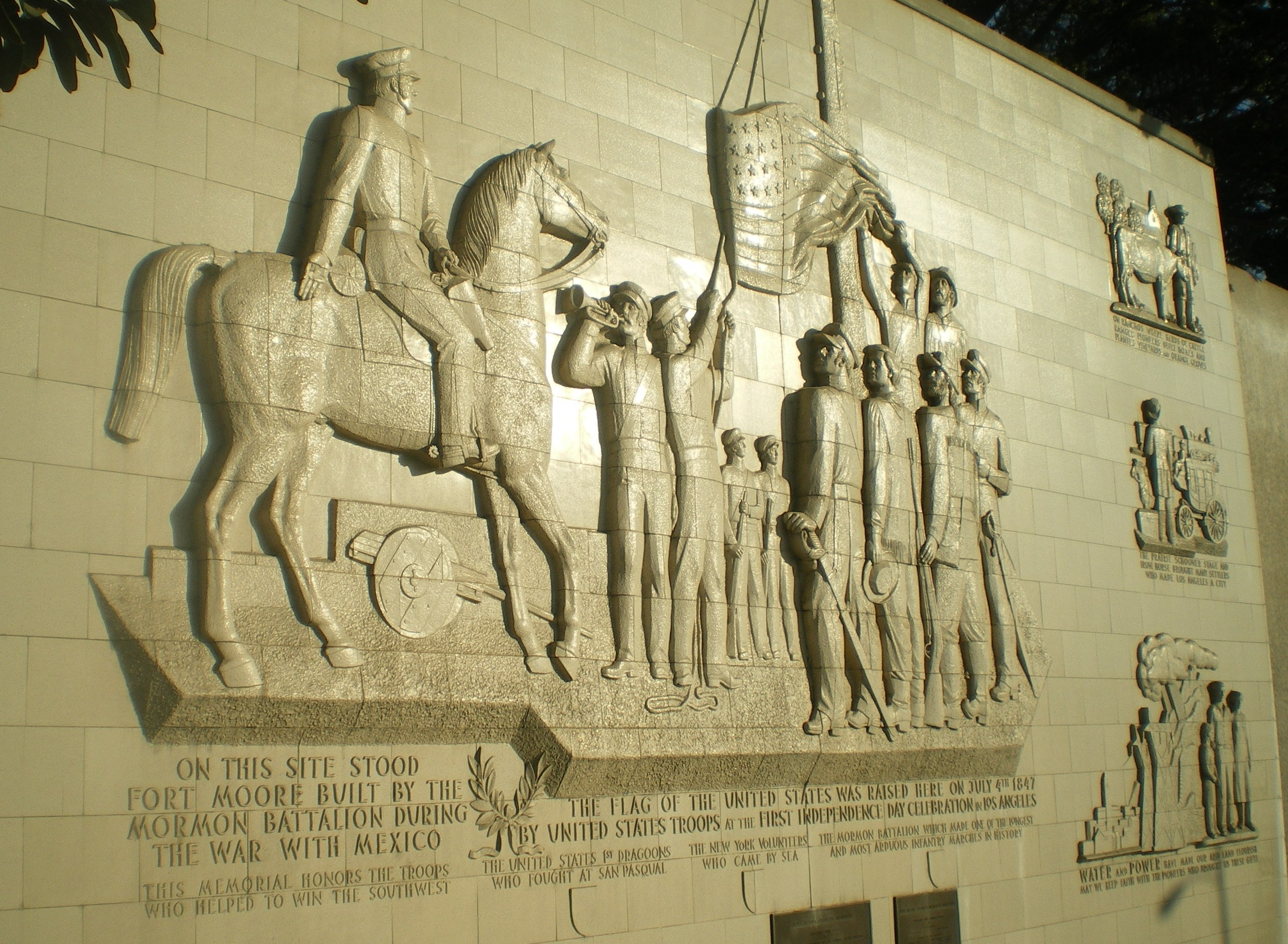
- Memorial to the battalion at the Fort Moore Pioneer Memorial, Los Angeles
- Active: July 1846 – July 1847
- Disbanded: 1847
- Country: United States
- Branch: United States Army
- Garrison/HQ: Fort Leavenworth, Kansas
- Engagements: Mexican–American War: California Long March (1846–1847); Battle of the Bulls (1846); Capture of Tucson (1846)

Commanders
- Notable commanders: Lieutenant Colonel James Allen (July–August 1846); Captain Jefferson Hunt (August 1846); Lieutenant Andrew Jackson Smith (August–October 1846); Lieutenant Colonel Philip St. George Cooke (October 1846-May 1847); Captain Jefferson Hunt (May–July 1846)

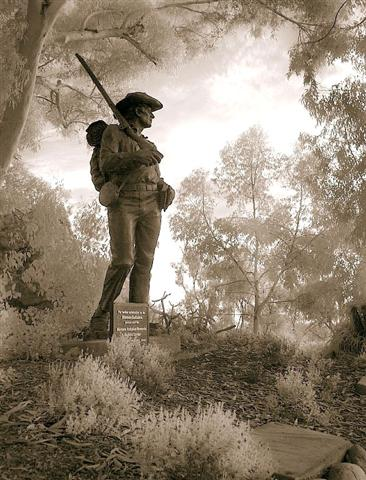
"Mormon Battalion Monument" by Edward J. Fraughton, Presidio Park, San Diego, California

The Mormon Battalion was an infantry battalion of the United States Army. It was the only unit in American military history recruited solely from one religious group and having a religious title as the unit designation. The volunteers served from July 1846 to July 1847 during the Mexican–American War of 1846–1848. The battalion was a volunteer unit of between 543 and 559 enlisted soldiers from The Church of Jesus Christ of Latter-day Saints led by Mormon junior officers and non-Mormon senior officers. (Note: The numbers provided above include non-military persons who were merely camp followers; family members, officers servants, laundresses and other camp followers. The original muster and pay rolls have been located at the National Archives and analysis of names, offices and service are underway. A scholarly paper is being prepared to share the documented Army records giving the most accurate number for Battalion membership. In addition, recent research has identified more persons who traveled with the Battalion but who were not officially part of the military unit. These persons will also be publicly identified soon.) During its service, the battalion made a march of nearly 1,950 miles from Council Bluffs, Iowa, to San Diego, California.

The battalion's march and service supported the eventual cession of much of the American Southwest from Mexico to the United States, especially the Gadsden Purchase of 1854 of portions of modern southern Arizona and New Mexico, extending the American-Mexican border further south to access the most suitable surveyed east-west land route for the future trans-continental railroad (later constructed 1866–1869). The battalion's march also opened a southern wheeled wagon accessible route to California. Veterans of the battalion played significant roles in America's westward expansion in California, Utah, Nevada, Arizona, and other parts of the West.

== Enlistment ==
At the time they enlisted, members of the Church of Jesus Christ of Latter-day Saints were seeking U.S. government aid for their migration west to the Rocky Mountains and Salt Lake Valley, despite having their previous petitions for redress of grievances denied. Under continued religious persecution, they had fled Nauvoo, Illinois, starting on February 4, 1846, across the Mississippi River. They camped among the Potawatomi Indians near present-day Council Bluffs, Iowa.

Brigham Young, (1801–1877, served 1847–1877), the President of the Quorum of the Twelve Apostles, (second L.D.S. Church President) sent Elder Jesse C. Little (1815–1893), to Washington, D.C., to seek assistance from the federal government for the Mormon Pioneers fleeing from the Illinois mobs. Little arrived in Washington, D.C., on May 21, 1846, only eight days after Congress had declared war on Mexico. Pennsylvania Army officer and attorney Thomas L. Kane (1822-1883), offered the Mormons his advice and assistance. Politically well connected through his jurist father, Kane provided letters of recommendation and joined Little in Washington, D.C. The two called on members of the President's Cabinet - the U.S. Secretary of State, the Secretary of War, and 11th president James K. Polk. (1795–1849, served 1845–1849), After several interviews in early June 1846, President Polk agreed to Mr. Little's offer if "a few hundred" men enlisted. On June 2, 1846, President James K. Polk wrote in his diary: "Col. [Stephen W.] Kearny was ... authorized to receive into service as volunteers a few hundred of the Mormons who are now on their way to California, with a view to conciliate them, attach them to our country, and prevent them from taking part against us."

On July 1, 1846, Captain James Allen, dispatched by Colonel (later Brigadier General) Stephen W. Kearny, (1794–1848), of the U.S. Army arrived at the Mormons' Mosquito Creek camp. He carried President Polk's request for a battalion of 500 volunteers to fight in the coming Mexican War. Most members of the Church were suspicious of the request, as the Federal government had ignored the persecutions that they suffered. They were concerned about facing discrimination by the government, as they had from both the state and federal government in the past.

Kane obtained Federal government permission for the refugee Mormons to occupy Pottawattamie and Omaha Indian lands along the Missouri River. After carrying dispatches relating to the land agreements and battalion criteria to famous Mid-Western military post of Fort Leavenworth in the then larger Indian Territory (1834–1907, later that part in the future Kansas Territory, 1854 then subsequent state of Kansas, 1861). Capt. Kane sought out Jesse Little in the Mormon encampments on the Missouri River. On July 17, 1846, he held a meeting with church leaders and Army Captain Allen.

Young had planned on moving the Mormons west that summer, but circumstances were against his plan. He saw several possible advantages to the Saints in the proposed federal service. Their enlistment would be a public relations victory for the church, demonstrating additional evidence of its loyalty to the United States. As the drafted men were given a uniform allowance at Fort Leavenworth, (future Kansas), of US$42 each, paid in advance, for their one-year enlistment and as they were allowed to wear their civilian clothing for the march, the bulk of those funds were immediately donated to a general Church fund. These funds were used to purchase wagons, teams, and other necessities for the American exodus (Actual wages paid over the next year to the Mormon Battalion totaled nearly $30,000). Having been forced to leave farms and homes in Nauvoo, Illinois, the Latter-day Saints were going to spend the winter on the banks of the upper Missouri River. Raising a group of able-bodied men would be difficult. Many men had already scattered to outlying areas where they sought jobs with wages to help support the group. Young wrote a letter to the Saints living in Garden Grove in which he justified the call-up and asked for help:

The President wants to do us good and secure our confidence. The outfit of this five hundred men costs us nothing, and their pay will be sufficient to take their families over the mountains. There is war between Mexico and the United States, to whom California must fall a prey, and if we are the first settlers the old citizens cannot have a Hancock or Missouri pretext to mob the Saints. The thing is from above for our own good.

The public approval of Young and other members of the Twelve were critical to gain men's enlistment. While some men quickly volunteered, Young had to persuade reluctant enlistees. It took three weeks to raise the five companies of men.

Allen's instructions were to recruit "four or five companies" of men who were to receive the "pay, rations, and other allowances given to other infantry volunteers." Each company was authorized four women as laundresses, "receiving rations and other allowances given to the laundresses of our army." Approximately thirty-three women, twenty of whom served as laundresses, and fifty-one children accompanied the men. Five women would eventually complete the cross-continental trek. The Mormon Battalion was mustered into volunteer service on July 16, 1846, as part of the Army of the West under Brigadier General Stephen Kearny, a seasoned military veteran. His units included two regiments of Missouri volunteers, a regiment of New York volunteers who had traveled by ships around South America and Cape Horn to the Pacific Ocean and arrived in California to meet Gen. Kearney with there, artillery and infantry battalions, Kearny's own 1st US Dragoons (cavalry), and the battalion of Mormons. For years afterward, some Mormons viewed the Mormon Battalion as an unjust imposition and as an act of persecution by the United States.

== Journey begins ==
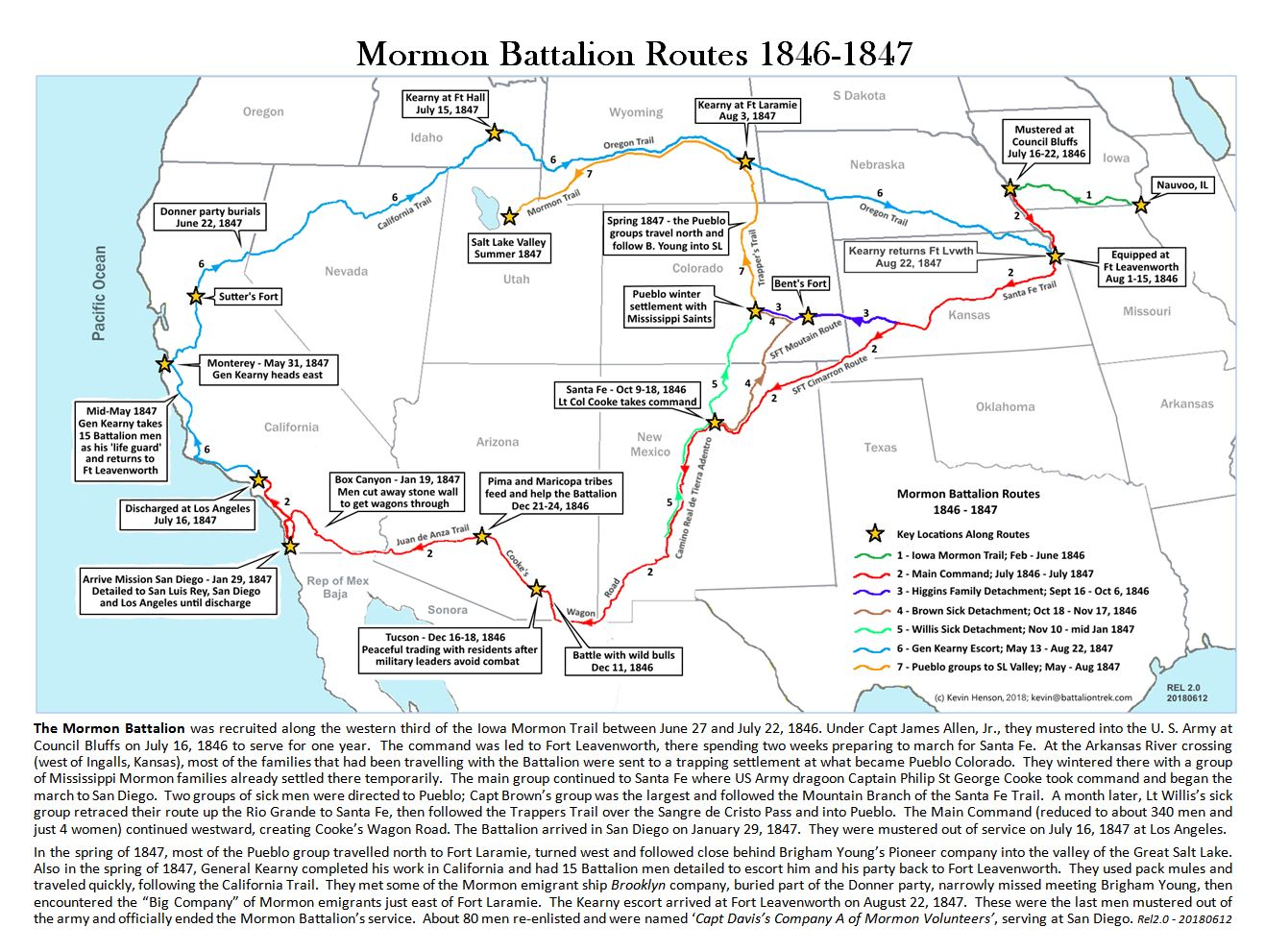
Revised map of Mormon Battalion routes with all detachment routes shown.

The battalion arrived at Fort Leavenworth on August 1. For the next two weeks, they drew their clothing allowance of $42 per man, received their equipment (Model 1816 smoothbore flintlock muskets and a few Harper's Ferry Model 1803 Rifles), and were more formally organized into a combat battalion. The volunteers took the approved clothing allowance in cash per regulations. To assure the main body of the group benefited from the men's wages, Young sent Parley Pratt to see that the men handed over the pay they had committed to contribute. Young used this and the wages they earned later to buy supplies for the main group at wholesale prices in St. Louis, Missouri. He wrote to the enlistees that the money was a "peculiar manifestation of the kind providence of our Heavenly Father at this time." There was little time for training and instilling discipline. Newly promoted Lieutenant Colonel James Allen became ill but ordered the battalion forward along the Santa Fe Trail to overtake Kearny's Army of the West. On August 23, Allen died and was the first officer buried there in the old officer's burial grounds. Later his remains were moved to what became Fort Leavenworth National Military Cemetery.

This flag is thought to have been carried by Pueblo Detachment and later raised at Ensign Peak

Captain Jefferson Hunt, commanding A Company, was the acting commander until word reached Council Grove, Kansas, that Allen had died. While there, Lieutenant Andrew Jackson Smith, West Point Class of 1838, arrived and was given temporary command of the battalion with the Mormons' consent. For the next several weeks, the Mormon soldiers came to hate "AJ" Smith and the assistant surgeon, Dr. George B. Sanderson, for their treatment of the men, and the long marches suffered across the dry plains of Kansas and New Mexico. The Mormon men were not accustomed to the austere military standards of the day nor to the medical treatments imposed by Dr. Sanderson, including the use of feeding mercury compounds to the sick, which were standard for the time. Because the church leaders had counseled the battalion members to avoid military medical treatment, they challenged the doctor's authority and unrest arose among the men. Smith and Sanderson continued to hold the Mormon Battalion to ordinary standards of discipline, and tensions continued.

=== Cooke assumes command ===
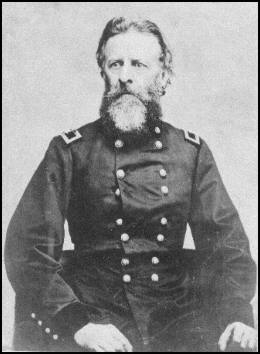
Philip St. George Cooke

Arriving in Santa Fe in October, General Kearny had dispatched Captain (brevet promotion to lieutenant colonel) Philip St. George Cooke, West Point class of 1827, to assume command of the battalion. His assignment was to march them to California and to build a wagon road along the way (today known as Cooke's Wagon Road). In Santa Fe, 91 sick men and all but five of the women and one child were sent to Pueblo, in present-day Colorado. Three separate detachments left the battalion and went to Pueblo to winter. For the next three months and 1,100 miles, Cooke led the battalion across some of the most arduous terrain in North America. Most of the Mormon soldiers soon learned to respect and follow him. The group acquired another guide in New Mexico – adventurer and mountain man Jean Baptiste Charbonneau, who as an infant had traveled with his mother Sacagawea across the continent with the Lewis and Clark Expedition.

Lieutenant Smith and Dr. Sanderson continued with the battalion, along with Lt. George Stoneman, newly graduated from West Point that Spring. During the Civil War, Cooke, Smith and Stoneman were promoted to high-level commands for the Union Army, and Stoneman would later be elected Governor of California.

=== Battle of the Bulls ===
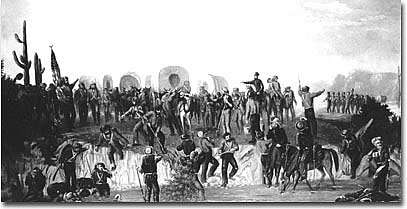
A later-19th-century painting depicting the Mormon Battalion reaching the Gila River in the Sonoran Desert of Arizona

The only "battle" they fought was near the San Pedro River in present-day Arizona against a sizable number of wild cattle. The battalion reached this area in December 1846, and their presence aroused curiosity among these animals. After the bulls of these herds caused destruction to some of the mules and wagons and resulted in two men being wounded, the men loaded their guns and attacked the charging bulls, killing 10–15 of the wild cattle, causing the event to be termed the "Battle of the Bulls".

=== Capture of Tucson ===
Approaching Tucson, in present-day Arizona, the Battalion nearly had a battle with a small detachment of provisional Mexican soldiers on December 16, 1846. The Mexicans retreated as the US battalion approached. Cooke never seems to have considered the encounter as capturing the town. He never made that claim. The local O'odham and other Piman tribes along the march route were helpful and charitable to the American soldiers. Mormon soldiers learned irrigation methods from these native inhabitants and employed the techniques later as pioneers in Utah and other areas.

=== Temecula massacre ===
Nearing the end of their journey, the battalion passed through Temecula, California during the aftermath of the Temecula massacre, in which Californio soldiers and Cahuilla warriors attacked the Luiseño, killing several dozen. The battalion stood guard to prevent further bloodshed while the Luiseño gathered their dead into a mass grave.

== Journey complete ==
The Mormon Battalion arrived in San Diego on January 29, 1847, after a march of some 2,080 miles from Iowa. For the next five months until their discharge on July 16, 1847, in Los Angeles, the battalion trained and performed occupation duties in several locations in southern California. The most significant service the battalion provided in California was as a reliable unit under Cooke to reinforce General Kearny's one company of army dragoons. The construction of Fort Moore in Los Angeles was one measure Cooke employed to protect military control under Kearny. Some 22 Mormon men died from disease or other natural causes during their service. About 80 of the men re-enlisted for another six months of service.

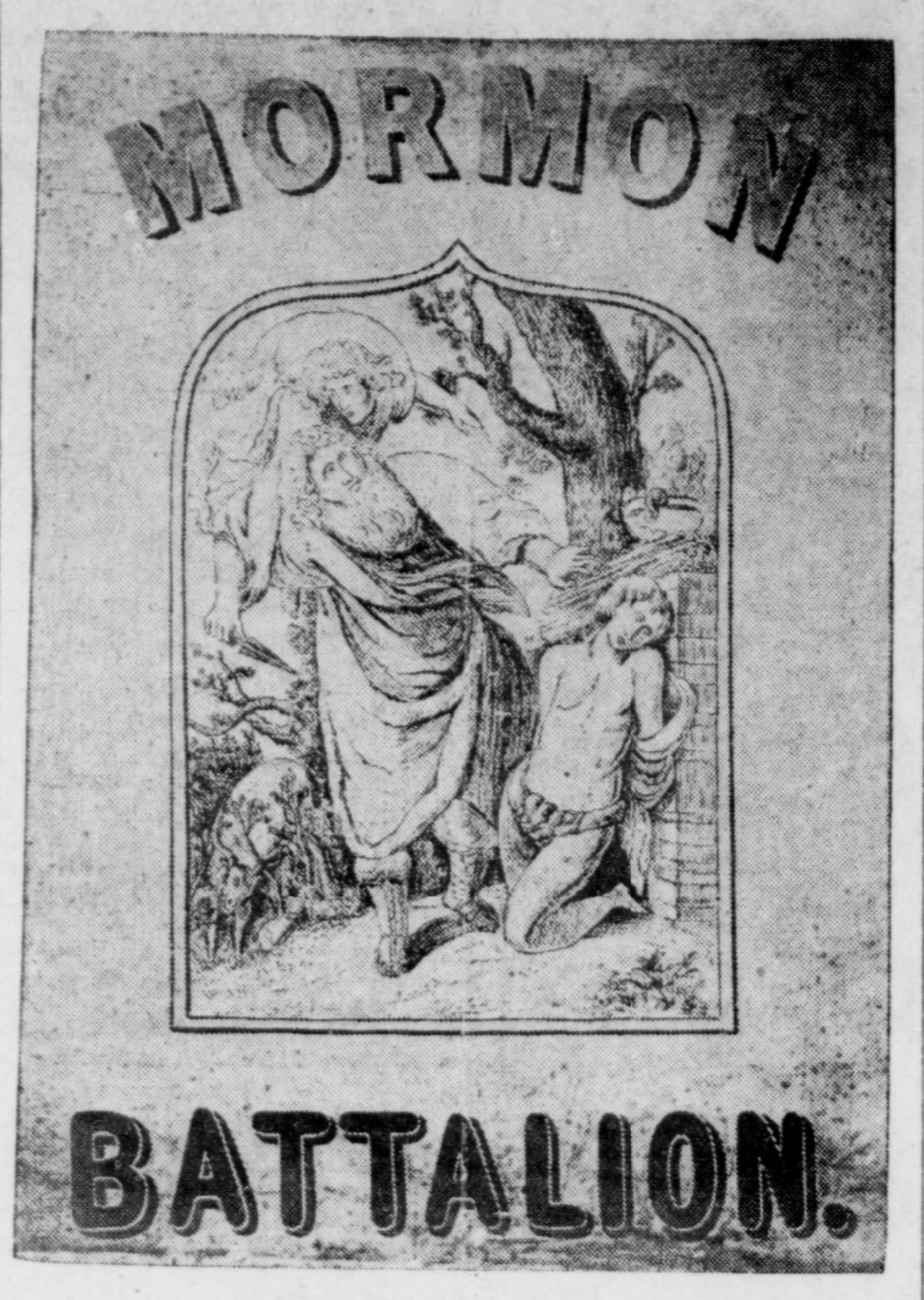
Banner carried by the Battalion

Fifteen men were selected to accompany General Kearny and escort John C. Fremont back east to his court-martial. During their journey over the Sierra Nevada, these men encountered one of the campsites of the Donner Party, and were ordered to bury the human remains and clean up the area.

After being mustered out, Jesse D. Hunter, captain of Company B, was appointed Indian Agent for southern California by the military governor, Colonel Richard Mason. Hunter was California's third indian agent, the first two being Johann Sutter and Mariano Vallejo, both appointed by Mason's predecessor, Stephen Kearny. Hunter's mission was to protect ranchos and missions from depredations, and to generally control the Indian labor force, to the point of requiring Indians to carry passports.

Nearly 100 discharged veterans worked in the Sacramento, area for James W. Marshall at Sutter's Mill. Henry Bigler recorded in his diary the actual date when gold was discovered, January 24, 1848. This gold find started the California Gold Rush the next year. $17,000 in gold was contributed to the economy of the Latter-day Saints' new home by members of the Mormon Battalion returning from California.

One group of discharged battalion members established the Carson Trail wagon road (also called the Mormon Emigrant Trail) on their return east. This road started near Placerville, California, and went across the crest of the Sierra Nevada at Carson Pass before dropping down and eventually meeting the already-established California Trail. The newly established route was afterwards used by many emigrants traveling to California's gold fields. Three members of this group were killed at a location which became known as Tragedy Spring.

== Historic sites and monuments ==
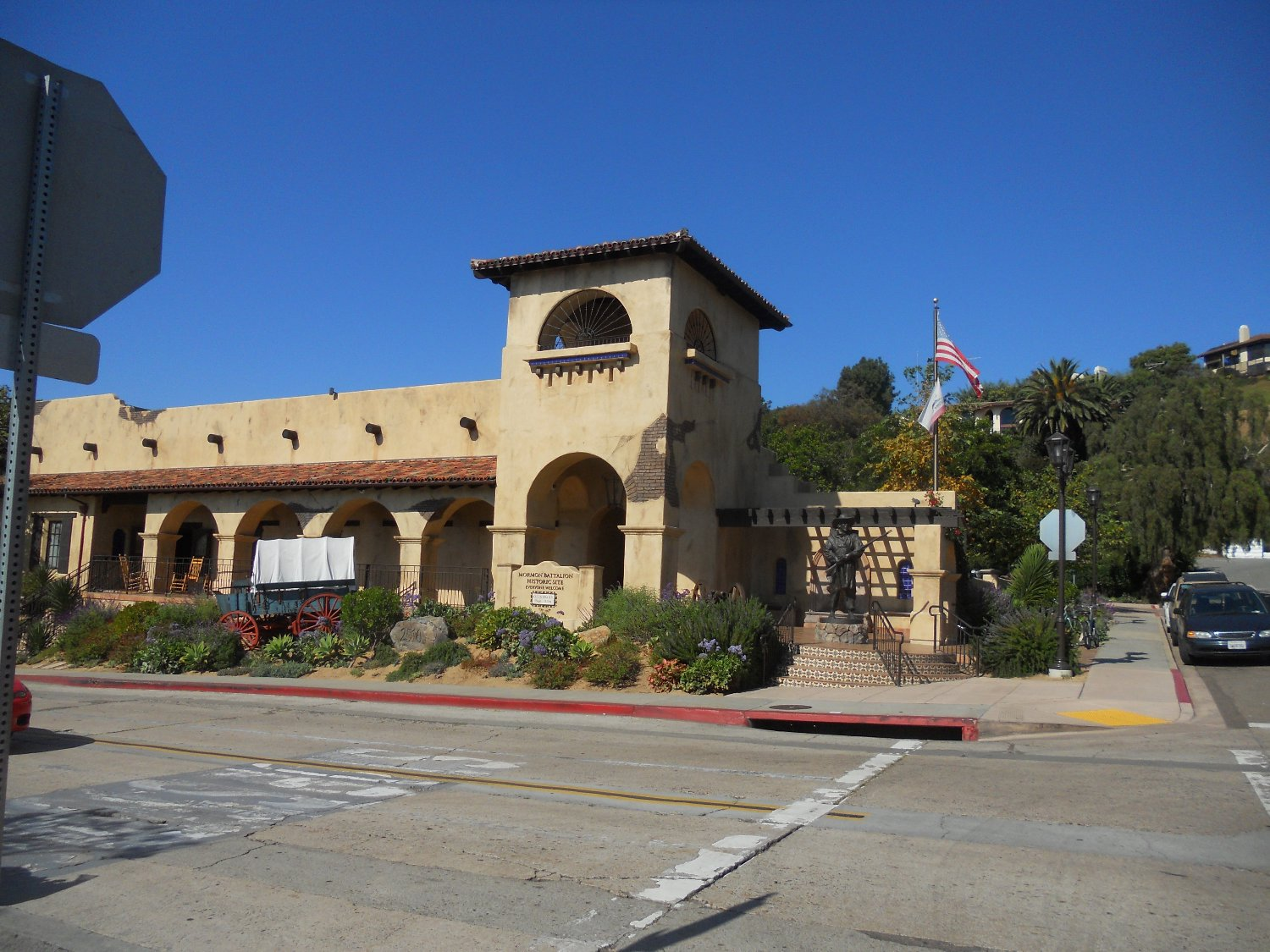
The San Diego Mormon Battalion Historic Site

Historic sites associated with the battalion include:

Iowa

- The Mormon Battalion Mustering Grounds on the campus of the Iowa School for the Deaf in Council Bluffs includes a short trail with interpretative signage. This site is located within half a mile of the actual site of the mustering.

Kansas

- A stone monument with a bronze plaque that describes the details of the Mormon Battalion is located on the grounds of the Kaw Mission State Historic Site in Council Grove, Kansas. This is the site at which the battalion camped while traveling along the Santa Fe Trail. Council Grove had a Government Blacksmith shop stationed along the Santa Fe Trail. Camp followers John and Jane Boscow (Burschough) died while at Council Grove and were buried not far from the later Kaw Mission Site.

New Mexico

- The Mormon Battalion Monument in Sandoval County, New Mexico, outside of Santa Fe. It is a tower of stone with a wagon wheel on top. A bronze plaque marks the contributions of the battalion and lays out the map of their travels across the Southwest.

Arizona

- A large bronze sculpture of a meeting between the Mormon Battalion and Mexican El Presidio leadership sits in the Northwest portion of El Presidio Park, adjacent to the Pima County Courthouse in downtown Tucson, Arizona. Although their nations were at war, the military contingents from both nations were able to avert armed confrontation in part via this peaceful meeting of representatives of both armies.
- A large bronze statue and monument is located in West Wetlands Park in Yuma, Arizona. It commemorates the crossing of the Colorado River.

California

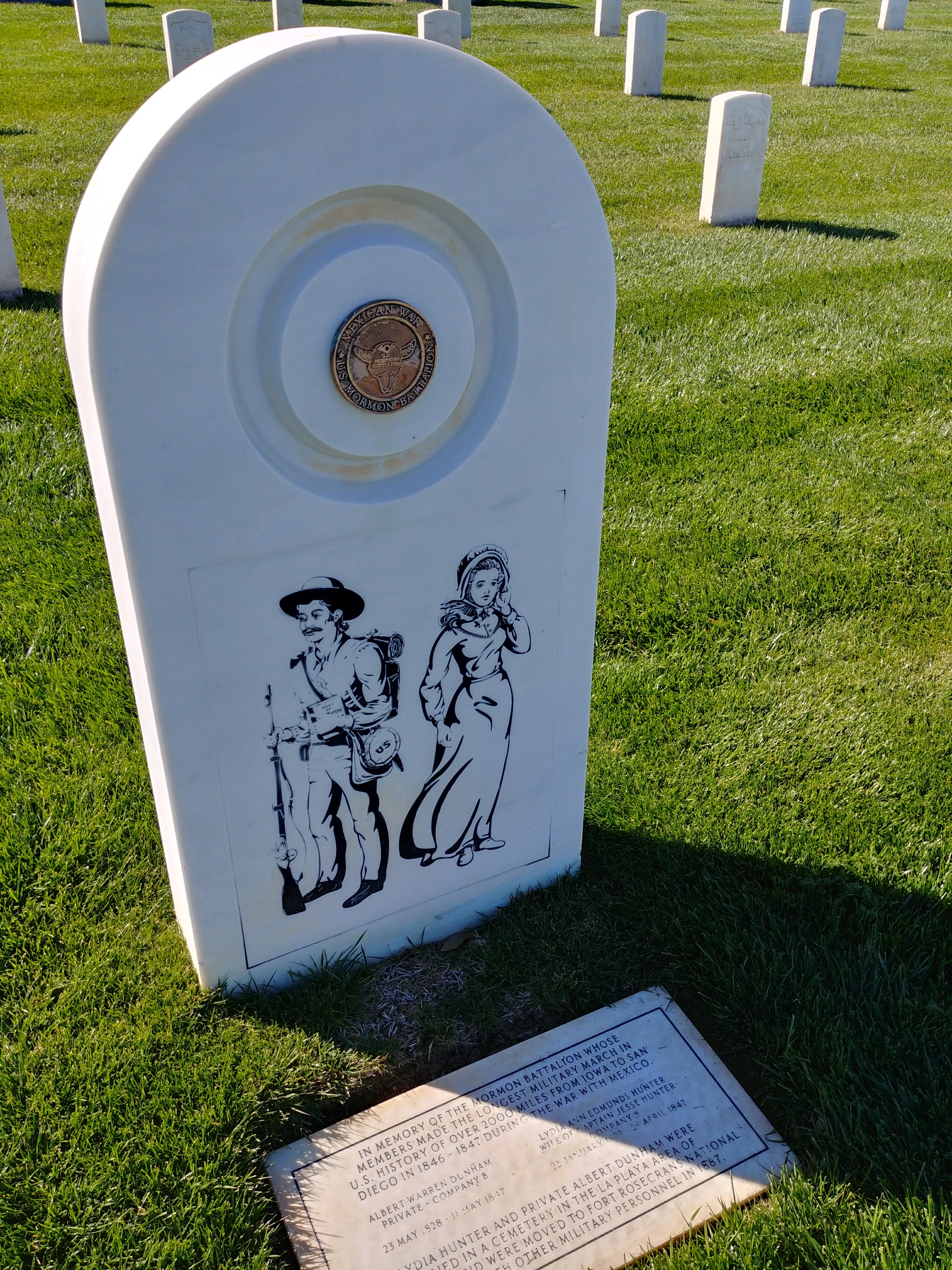
Mormon Battalion memorial, Fort Rosecrans National Cemetery

- Mormon Battalion Historic Site, a visitor center in the Old Town neighborhood of San Diego.
- Box Canyon historical site, in Anza Borrego Desert State Park, San Diego County, on Highway S-2, approximately 8.7 miles south of Highway 78 (Scissors Crossing). (GPS location: N33.0152, W116.4429) Here the Battalion cut a road into the rocky side of a canyon which was otherwise impassable to wagons. Remnants of the road cut into the rock wall are still visible.
- Fort Moore Pioneer Memorial, the largest bas-relief military monument in the United States, on Hill Street in downtown Los Angeles, dedicated in 1958 at the site of historic Fort Moore built by the Mormon Battalion in 1847, decommissioned in 1853.
- The Mormon Battalion Memorial in Fort Rosecrans National Cemetery, Point Loma, San Diego, erected in 1998.
- A sculpture of an infantryman of the battalion by Edward J. Fraughton erected in 1969 at Presidio Park, San Diego.
- Monument on the grounds of Mission San Luis Rey de Francia in Oceanside.
- As part of the "Southern California Sesquicentennial Celebration" in 1997, San Bernardino County renamed a low-lying mountain within Glen Helen Regional Park at the mouth of Cajon Canyon as "Mormon Battalion Mountain." Local Boy Scouts built a monument to the battalion consisting of a flagpole and stockade at the park.
- Mormon Rocks, northwest of San Bernardino, California, in the Cajon Pass, just west of Interstate 15 on State Route 138. Near Mormon Rocks, the first wagon road was blazed through the Cajon Pass in 1848 by 25 veteran Battalion soldiers, with the wagon of Captain Daniel C. Davis, wife Susan and son Danny in their journey to the Salt Lake Valley.

Utah

- The Mormon Battalion Monument at the Utah State Capitol, Salt Lake City.
- The Mormon Battalion Monument Plaza at This Is the Place Heritage Park in Salt Lake City, dedicated in 2010.
- The Mormon Battalion Museum in the lower level of the Visitor Center at This Is the Place Heritage Park.

Colorado

- Mormon Battalion Monument at Runyon Field Sports Complex in Pueblo, Colorado. The battalion's sick detachments wintered in this area.

Mormon Battalion Trail

- Trail markers have been placed on segments of the battalion route between Mount Pisgah (Iowa) and San Diego.
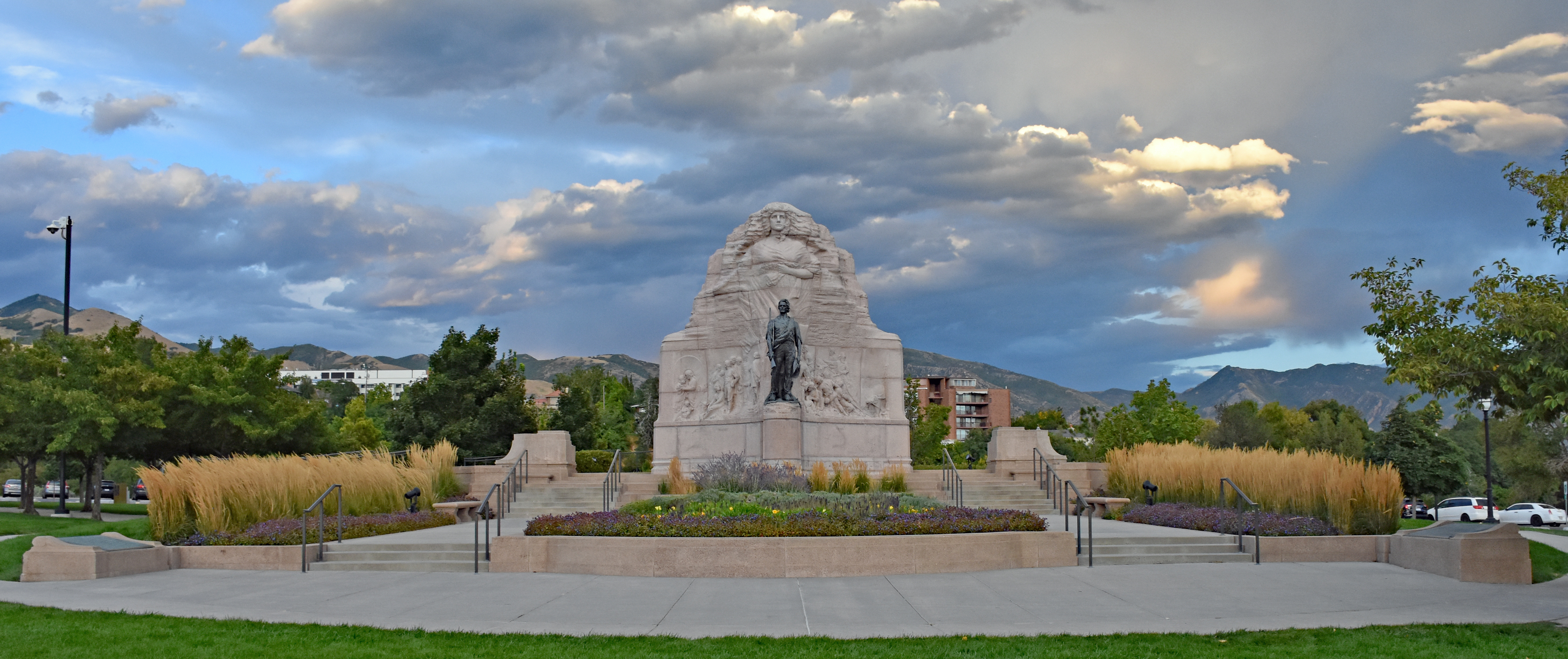
The Mormon Battalion Monument at the Utah State Capitol

== Notable members of the battalion ==
- Daniel C. Davis, namesake of Davis County, Utah
- Stephen Clark Foster, first American mayor of Los Angeles, California
- Jefferson Hunt, father of San Bernardino County, Brigadier-General of California Militia
- Elam Luddington, his wife (Mary) and mother (Lena) and two children, Elam served as an officer in the battalion and Mary as a laundress. He later served as the first missionary in Thailand (Siam) and chief of police in Salt Lake City.
- William Prows, first man to wash gold on the Comstock Lode
- James C. Sly, name sake of Sly Park in the Sierra Nevada Mountains
- Lot Smith, a teenage private in the battalion, became the first sheriff of Davis County, Utah, Mormon hero of the Utah War, General in the Nauvoo Legion and the first LDS stake president in Arizona.
- George Stoneman, Civil War general and Governor of California
- William S. S. Willes, a founder of Lehi, Utah
- James Allen, Recruited the battalion and served as the first commander; died at Ft. Leavenworth shortly after leading the battalion there. West Point Class of 1829. Allen was a brevet Lt. Col. and is buried in the Fort Leavenworth National Cemetery.
- Jean-Baptiste Charbonneau, scout and son of Sacagawea and the French trader Toussaint Charbonneau, who were members of Lewis and Clark's Corps of Discovery
- Andrew Jackson Smith, second commander of the battalion, West Point Class of 1838, and major general during the American Civil War
- Philip St. George Cooke, third commander of the battalion, West Point graduate, veteran of the Black Hawk War, cavalry commander during the Army's expedition to Utah in 1857, and major general during the American Civil War
- Christopher Layton, patriarch, coloniser and businessman, namesake of Layton, Utah.
- Ebenezer Brown, one of the founders of Draper, Utah

== Current research ==
A resurgence of interest in the battalion is linked to the 175th anniversary of the battalion's service. Original documents held at the National Archives have been located, including original muster and pay rolls. These are being prepared for public access online along with transcriptions. A more accurate count and list of participants is being prepared. A series of events are being planned along the routes during 2021–2022.

== See also ==
- Bibliography of the Mexican American War
- Bibliography of James K. Polk
- California Battalion
- California Gold Rush
- Lot Smith Cavalry Company
- Nauvoo Legion
- Southern Emigrant Trail
- Trapper's Trail
- Utah Territorial Militia
