= Mormon Battalion Historic Site =

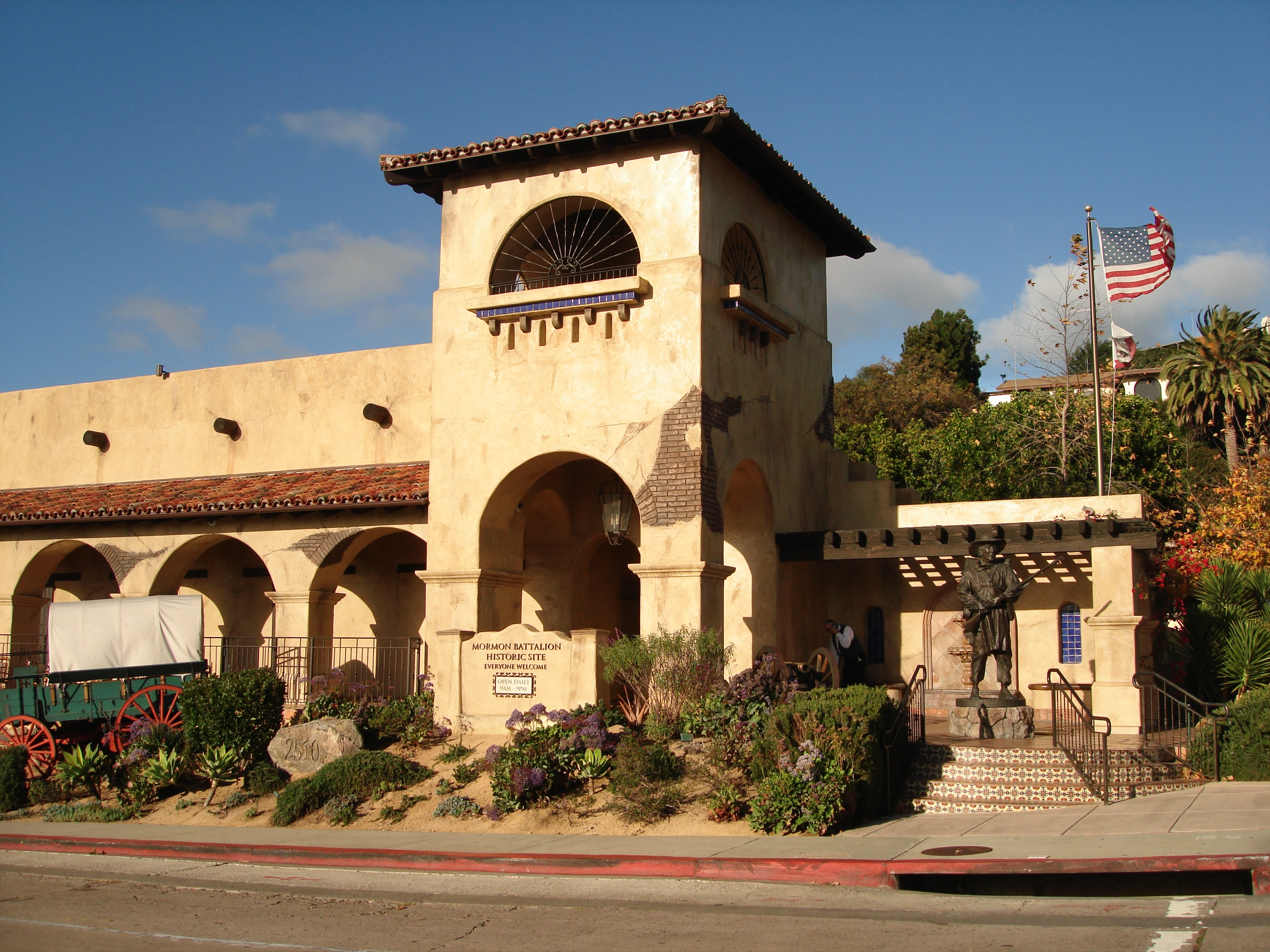
- Interactive map of the Mormon Battalion Historic Site area
- Former names: San Diego Visitors Center, Mormon Battalion Memorial Visitors Center

General information
- Location: 2510 Juan St., San Diego, California, United States
- Coordinates: 32°45′15.09″N 117°11′38.47″W
- Inaugurated: November 3, 1972
- Renovated: June 2008–January 2010
- Owner: The Church of Jesus Christ of Latter-day Saints

Website
- Mormon Battalion Historic Site at San Diego

The Mormon Battalion Historic Site is a historic site in Old Town, San Diego, California, built in honor of the members of the Church of Jesus Christ of Latter-day Saints (LDS Church) who served in the United States Army's Mormon Battalion during the Mexican–American War of 1846–1848. The battalion was stationed in Old Town in 1847, during which they participated in many civic improvement projects.

== History ==
The original visitors' center was dedicated by church president Harold B. Lee on November 3, 1972, and opened to the public on November 6. In June 2008, the center was closed, and a new center, constructed with some existing elements, was built on the footprint of the original. The new center was opened to the public on January 30, 2010 and dedicated by church apostle Jeffrey R. Holland on March 26, 2010.

== The Mormon Battalion ==
In 1846, in response to a call for midwesterners to bolster the U.S. Army during the Mexican-American War, a group composed largely of Mormons formed the Mormon Battalion. In July of that year, 496 men, 36 women and 43 children left Council Bluffs, Iowa, to assist the war efforts in California. The ensuing six-month, 2,000 mile journey was one of the longest marches in U.S. history. 27 of the group members died due to illness and accidents. Most of the remaining women and children stayed in Pueblo, Colorado. 335 men and four women continued on to San Diego, under the command of Lt. Philip St. George Cooke.

The battalion arrived in San Diego on January 29, 1847. By this time, fighting had ended. Left without their original purpose, the members of the battalion instead found work in helping to secure San Diego. They engaged in such pursuits as building a bakery, digging wells, blacksmithing, cart repair, whitewashing existing buildings, and brickmaking. They also built the first fired-brick structure in San Diego on the town plaza, facing San Diego Avenue. The building was originally designed to be a town hall, and it later became the first courthouse in San Diego.

== See also ==
- Mormon Battalion Monument (Presidio Park, San Diego)
