= Blair Buswell =

American artist (born 1956)

- Born: 1956 (age 69–70)
- Education: B.A. (1982)
- Alma mater: Brigham Young University
- Occupation: Figurative Sculptor
- Known for: Pro Football Hall of Fame busts

Blair Buswell (born 1956) is an American artist who specializes in sports sculptures and has created almost 100 of the Pro Football Hall of Fame busts.

Originally from North Ogden, Utah, Buswell began his formal art training at Ricks College. He subsequently transferred to Brigham Young University on an art scholarship where he also played as a running back for the Cougars football team. Graduating in 1982, Buswell found a marriage of his love for art and sports in sculpting. He has sculpted over 80 busts of all new Pro Football Hall of Fame inductees since 1983, including that of former BYU teammate Steve Young, John Madden, Pat Bowlen and Randy Moss. He has also created the NFL Special Service Award as well as medallions for Super Bowls XIX, XX and XXI.

Buswell lives in Alpine, Utah and is a member of the Church of Jesus Christ of Latter-day Saints.

== Works ==
Buswell sculpted a statue of Jack Nicklaus for the Georgia Golf Hall of Fame in Augusta, Georgia, and another of basketball great Oscar Robertson for Cincinnati University. He sculpted the Doak Walker Award, which is given annually to the top college running back in the country. He has also sculpted the likes of Charlton Heston, Harold B. Lee, Thomas S. Monson, Robert Neyland, W.A. Criswell and San Carlos Borromeo.

A bronze statue of Coach John Wooden by Buswell was dedicated at the newly renovated Pauley Pavilion at UCLA on October 26, 2012. Buswell helped with the unveiling.

He and Edward Fraughton worked together on the Pioneer Courage sculptures marking the "gateway to the West" in Omaha's central business district.
