= Mormon Battalion Monument (Presidio Park, San Diego) =

Monument in Presidio Park, San Diego, California

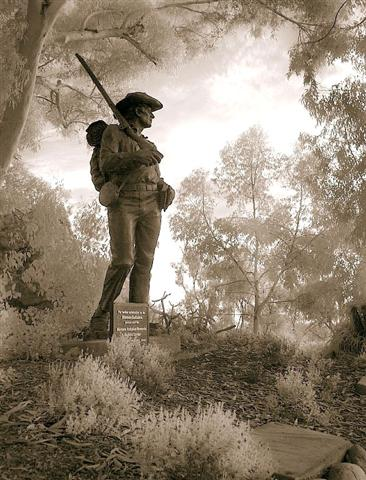
- Artist: Edward J. Fraughton
- Year: 1969
- Subject: Mormon Battalion, Mexican–American War
- Dimensions: 290 cm (9.5 ft)
- Location: San Diego, California
- 32°45′25.9″N 117°11′39″W
- Owner: City of San Diego

The Mormon Battalion Monument is a historic bronze statue in Presidio Park, San Diego, California. It represents the archetypal member of the Church of Jesus Christ of Latter-day Saints (LDS Church) who served in the United States Army's Mormon Battalion during the Mexican–American War of 1846–1848.

== History ==
The statue was commissioned by the Sons of Utah Pioneers as a gift to the City of San Diego. Its construction cost $18,000. It was designed by Utah sculptor Edward J. Fraughton and cast in Italy.

The dedication, held on November 22, 1969, was attended by 200 Mormon and Sons of Utah Pioneers members. Hugh B. Brown, the grandson of a Mormon Battalion veteran and a Mormon leader in his own right, gave a speech in which he reminded the audience that Brigham Young, the LDS Church's second president, had praised the battalion. Words of congratulation from President Richard Nixon, California Governor Ronald Reagan and Utah Governor Cal Rampton were read out loud. The ceremony ended with a concert by the United States Marine Band.

== Description ==
According to the Smithsonian American Art Museum online catalog, "A male infantryman seen standing, dressed in western style hat and moccasin shoes. He is carrying the Book of Mormon in his proper left hand; and holds a rifle over his proper right shoulder. He has a canteen slung across his chest, and wears a backpack with a bedroll. A Bible is stuffed in the pocket of the backpack. He strides forward with his proper left leg."

For Fraughton, "He is a man of power and strength, maturity and youth. He is not involved in himself but looking into the future."

== See also ==
- Mormon Battalion Historic Site
