= Battle of Tucson =

Battle of Tucson or Capture of Tucson may refer to:

- First Battle of Tucson, December 6, 1779, during the Apache–Mexico Wars
- Second Battle of Tucson, May 1, 1782, during the Apache–Mexico Wars
- Third Battle of Tucson (1782), December 25, 1782, during the Apache–Mexico Wars
- Fourth Battle of Tucson, 21 March, 1784, during the Apache–Mexico Wars
- Capture of Tucson (1846), during the Mexican–American War
- Capture of Tucson (1862), during the American Civil War
