= Traditional Arizona =

Aspect of state history

Coordinates: 32°N 110°W

The original Gadsden Purchase is shown in yellow, the same as the original scope of Arizona in the form of its own county, post-Purchase.

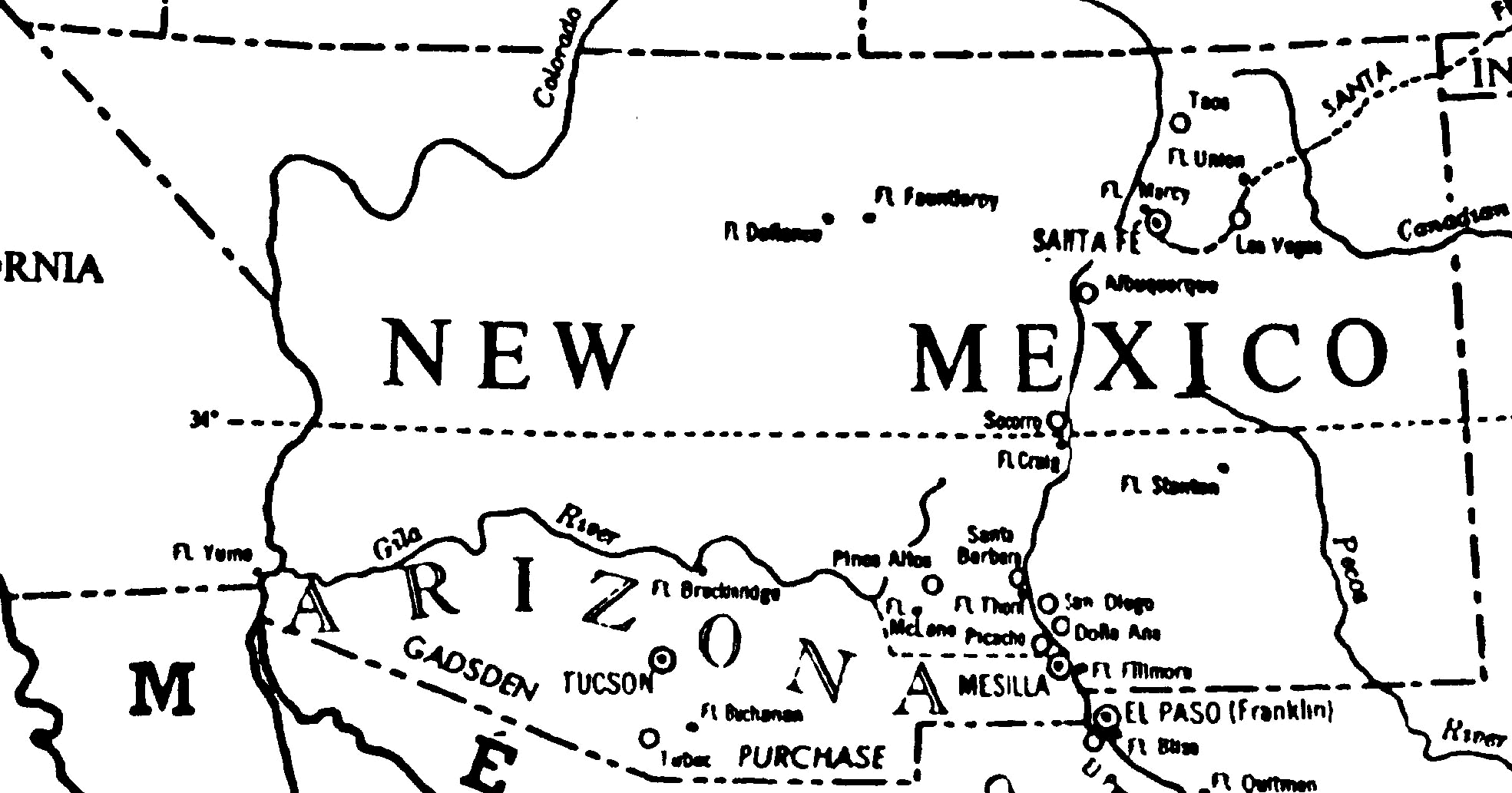
First ("Traditional Arizona") and second (CSA "Arizona Territory") incarnations of Arizona. Territorial Arizona would include Dona Ana, Mesilla, Ewell and Castle Dome counties.

Prior to the adoption of its name for a U.S. state, Arizona was traditionally defined as the region south of the Gila River to the present-day Mexican border, and between the Colorado River and the Rio Grande. It encompasses present-day Southern Arizona and the New Mexico Bootheel plus adjacent parts of Southwestern New Mexico. This area was transferred from Mexico to the United States in the Gadsden Purchase of 1853. Mining and ranching were the primary occupations of traditional Arizona's inhabitants, though growing citrus fruits had long been occurring in Tucson.

== History ==
=== Pre Civil War ===
Socio-politically, some of the founders of Arizona were from areas which were once the Republic of Texas, though many were from the area's heartland around Tucson, Arizona, settlers who had flocked to the region during the California Gold Rush of the 1840s. They maintained their eastern links via Mesilla, on traditional Arizona's border with Texas, to San Antonio, Texas. Most others were from elsewhere in the United States, as opposed to the Mexican citizens from Sonora and settlers from other settlements of the Midwest. Texas was the lifeline for Arizona, but only until California was established as a U.S. state, meaning Arizona had access to two separate lines of communications and food for frontier settlements. The main line was the Butterfield Overland Mail company, which ran through southern Arizona. Traditional Arizona was never part of William Walker's Republic of Sonora, as it was created in January 1854, a year after the Gadsden Purchase which put traditional Arizona under United States control.

=== Civil War ===
The closure of the mail line was one of the main reasons Arizona would secede from the Union and petition to join the Confederate States. Another main concern for the creation of Arizona Territory was the problem of constant Apache attacks in Arizona's southern frontier. Arizonans were angry that there were not sufficient U.S. soldiers in the region to protect them from attack. The aim of becoming a separate American territory was realized after the First Battle of Mesilla when future governor, John R. Baylor defeated the Union garrison of Fort Fillmore with help from Arizonan militia. Mesilla and Tucson would become important towns for the Confederate war effort in the region. Tucson was an old Spanish presidio, protected by high adobe walls and had already been the scene of several Apache battles in the past. Tucson was also the largest settlement in Southern Arizona at the time and had already considered secession as far back as 1859, when Tucson citizens and Mesilla citizens petitioned the U.S. government for the creation of a Union Arizona territory, with this request being denied. Despite Tucson's presidio walls, the fortress had no garrison at the time of secession and therefore was an open city at first until the creation of a small militia force. Tubac, to the south of Tucson was another old Spanish presidio. Tucson's militia rescued the Tubacans during the Siege of Tubac in spring of 1861 under the command of Captain Granville Henderson Oury. After John R. Baylor established himself as Governor of Arizona, two district courts were created. The Confederates declared Mesilla the capital and home of the first district court, due to its geographical location, close to Texas and not beyond the vast stretch of desert that lies beyond Tucson and Mesilla. Tucson was home of the second district court. Not long after the official creation of Confederate Arizona in early 1862, Texan and Arizonan rebels defeated a Union cavalry patrol at the Battle of Canada Alamosa.

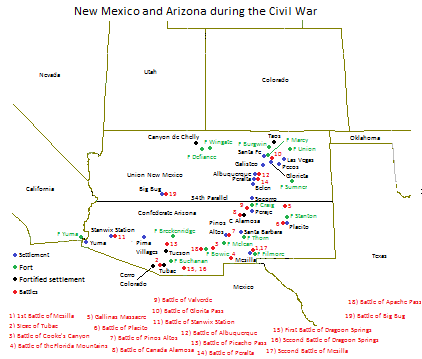

When Confederate General Henry Hopkins Sibley began his New Mexico Campaign to capture Union New Mexico, north of the 34th parallel, he dispatched a company of mounted Arizona militia and Texas Mounted Rifles to hold Tucson. They were commanded by Captain Sherod Hunter and composed of about seventy-five men. General Sibley went on to fight the Battle of Valverde, north of Mesilla. At Confederate Arizona's border with Union New Mexico, several other engagements were fought as well. Ultimately his army, comprising many Arizona militia, with supplies scarce in the region, won a tactical victory at the Battle of Glorieta Pass, but was forced to withdraw due to the loss of provisions.

In the meantime, the region suffered from the worst Apache conflict in the American history of the area. In the early 1860s, Mangas Coloradas and Cochise led thousands of Apache warriors in several different battles. Apaches attacked the Pinos Altos mining town in traditional Arizona, one of the major engagements between rebel Arizona militia and Apache warriors. Placito was also attacked, again Confederate States Army troops and Arizona militia successfully warded off the Apaches. After the failure of the New Mexico Campaign, Confederate Arizona's days were drawing to an end. Union forces advanced south from Fort Union and the California Column invaded Arizona from the west. The Californians under Colonel James H. Carleton captured the Confederate Fort Yuma on traditional Arizona's side of the Colorado River. No fight occurred as the rebels' cavalry garrison retreated into Mexico before Colonel Carleton's arrival. The Californians then moved on, using the old Butterfield Mail route as their path. Tucson's garrison was then tasked with delaying the Union invasion from the west. The garrison burnt several hay stations, which were actually former mail stations, abandoned before the war.

Californians and Confederates under Second Lieutenant John W. Swilling fought the small Battle of Stanwix Station. Gradually, Union pickets made their way to the Pima Villages. A force of eight Federal troops were captured there by the Confederates without conflict. Before the Californian invasion, the Union had sent spies into the region, with the mission of procuring supplies of food and hay for the California Column. The supplies were stored in the abandoned Butterfield Mail stations, with one cache in the Pima Villages. Once Carleton's main body reached the Pima Villages, they discovered that their much needed food had been taken by Confederate forces and resold to the Pimas. Having gone too far to turn back, the Californians advanced on Tucson. Confederate pickets were waiting for the Union advance at Picacho Peak. Their mission was to wait for the California Column, and upon sighting it, return to Tucson to alert Captain Sherod Hunter and his men. An advance Union cavalry patrol discovered the rebel camp at Picacho Peak and attacked. The Battle of Picacho Peak was fought, and the Union cavalry retreated back to their main body. At this time, Tucson was at the verge of falling, with no Confederate reinforcements having arrived in Tucson. Sherod Hunter, with only a company and some Tucson militia, was facing a Union army of over 2,000. As victory was impossible, most of the garrison withdrew just before the Capture of Tucson. A squad of Confederate troops were ordered to remain behind, under command of a Lieutenant. These men narrowly escaped the Union advance on the city. The lieutenant later reported that the Californians surrounded Tucson and then launched a full attack with infantry and cavalry, fully expecting to fight a battle. The Union troops entered the town as the column's band played Yankee Doodle. The rebels almost put up a fight but were dissuaded by an unknown Tucson woman. Tucson fell, so the Union advanced further south along the former mail route. In May, a foraging party of Sherod Hunter's company fought two engagements with Apaches in the Dragoon Mountains of traditional Arizona. The Union forces made it to Mowry, Arizona and arrested the former United States Army Lieutenant Sylvester Mowry at his mining camp.

The former lieutenant and Arizona Confederate sympathizer was charged with selling lead to rebels for use as ammunition. He was sent west and jailed in Yuma Territorial Prison from July 2 to November 9, 1862. He was released after a trip to Yuma's courthouse. In his defence he talked about the basic American principles of Life, Liberty and the Pursuit of Happiness; after the judge heard this Mowry was released. Many Arizonans at the time felt the same as Lieutenant Mowry. They felt that eastern New Mexico Territory was a place of great American progress on the frontier while the southwestern area, known as Arizona, was a war zone, unsuitable for life, without contact with the east and without protection against Apaches. Such was truly the case: Lieutenant Mowry's mine was destroyed by Apaches sometime after his arrest. The Californians advanced further, occupied southern Arizona's forts, and left garrisons behind, including one at Tucson. Once in Apache Pass some of Carleton's men were ambushed by Apaches who were led by Cochise, Mangas Coloradas and Geronimo. They fought the Battle of Apache Pass in mid June 1862 and won. Fort Bowie was established as result, to protect settlers against hostile Native Americans and to protect the nearby Butterfield Overland Mail station. Soon after the battle in Apache Pass, Mesilla fell without bloodshed and Confederate Arizona was at an end. The Union created their own Arizona Territory in 1863, with Tucson as the capital, but excluded Mesilla and its surroundings. This meant Arizona no longer bordered Texas, and the Arizonans of Mesilla, Pinos Altos and other towns were forced to remain New Mexican citizens.

== See also ==
- Arizona Territory
- Confederate Arizona
- Republic of Sonora
- Apache Wars
- Southern Arizona
- Neomexicanos
