= Presidio San Ignacio de Tubac =

Historic former fort in southern Arizona

Fort Tubac
- Tubac, Arizona
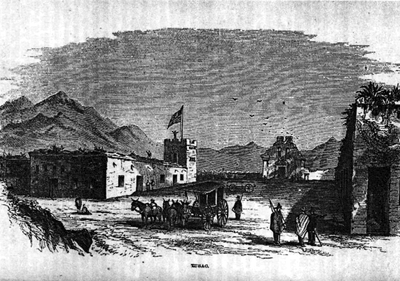
- Tubac as a United States Army post in 1869

Site information
- Type: Army post
- Controlled by: Arizona
- Condition: tourist attraction

Location
- Coordinates: 31°36′41″N 111°02′45″W

Site history
- Built: 1752
- Built by: Spain
- In use: 1752–1886
- Battles/wars: Apache–Mexico Wars; Apache Wars; American Civil War: Siege of Tubac

Garrison information
- Past commanders: Juan Bautista de Anza; Juan Fernandez Carmona; Granville H. Oury
- Occupants: Spanish Army; Mexican Army; United States Army; Confederate States Army

The Presidio of San Ignacio de Túbac or Fort Tubac was a Spanish built fortress. The fortification was established by the Spanish Army in 1752 at the site of present-day Tubac, Arizona. Its ruins are preserved in the Tubac Presidio State Historic Park.

== History ==
=== Spanish Period ===
The presidio was founded in 1752, in response to the 1751 Pima Rebellion. It housed a garrison of about fifty cavalry and or infantry soldiers and was intended to protect Spanish settlements and missions in the valley of the Santa Cruz River. In 1766, the garrison had 51 officers and men, and a settlement of forty families had grown up around the post. In 1774, Tubac's commander, Captain Juan Bautista de Anza, assembled the expedition that explored a land route from the Santa Cruz Valley to California.

A reorganization of frontier defenses in 1775 resulted in the transfer of the garrison. The force under Lieutenant Juan Fernandez Carmona was enlarged to fifty-six officers and men and received orders to proceed 40 miles (60 km) north to a site within present-day downtown Tucson, Arizona. There they constructed the Presidio San Augustin del Tucson in 1775 under the orders of Captain Hugh O'Conor. Eventually a new garrison formed in the Tubac presidio, which campaigned against the Apaches for decades until the Mexican War of Independence.

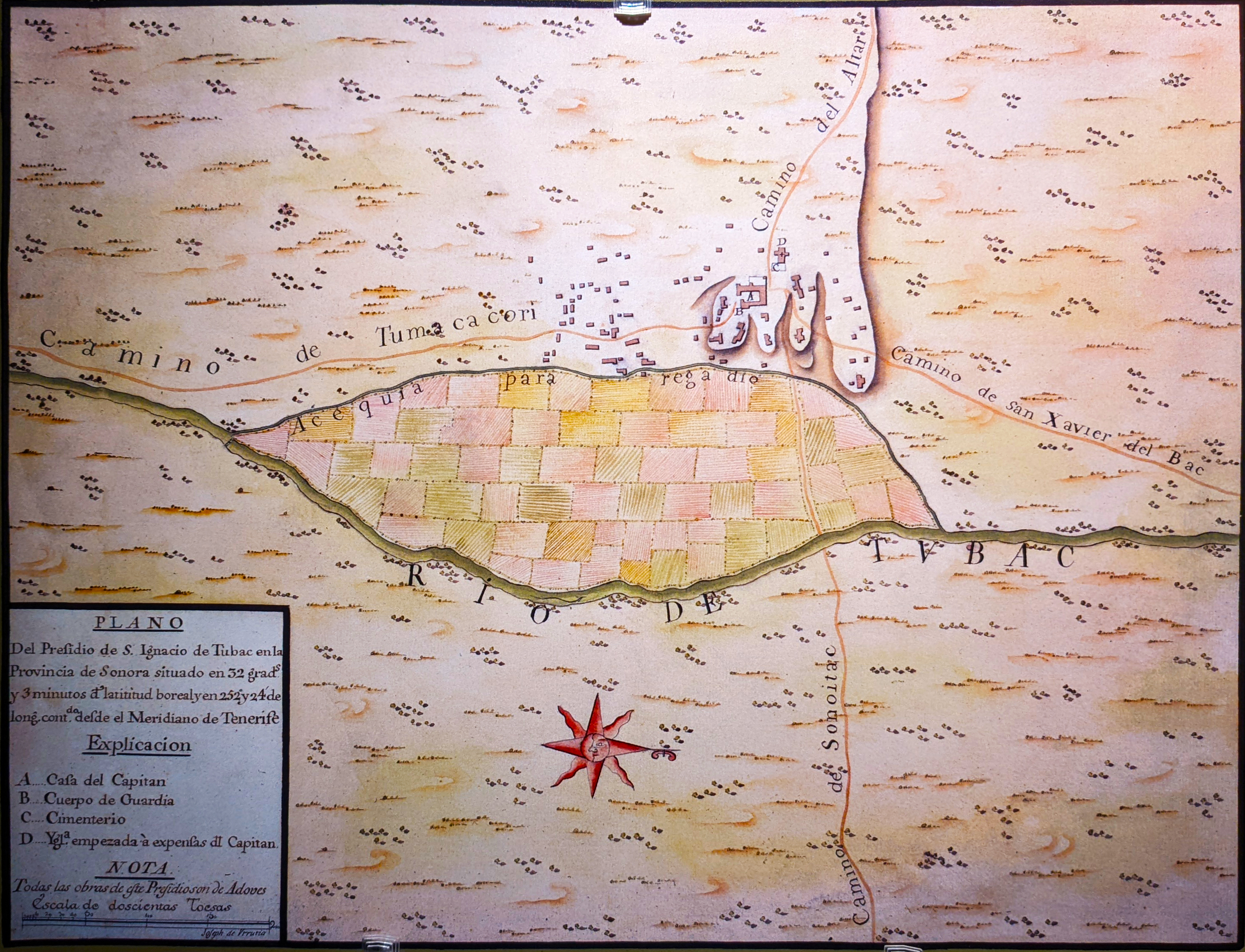
An early map of the presidio and surroundings.

In 1775 and 1776, de Anza escorted 240 colonists from San Miguel de Horcasitas (in Sonora, Mexico), to Monterey, California. Leaving the colonists at Monterey, de Anza continued north as far as present-day San Francisco, where he selected sites for the mission and presidio.

By the early years of the 19th century, Tubac's garrison continued to protect the area from raids by Apache Indians. In 1804, the post had two officers, two sergeants and eighty-four men. There were also eight families of Spanish settlers and 20 Indian families living within the presidio land allotment of 5 square miles (13 km^{2}). The garrison community had 1,000 head of cattle, 5,000 sheep, 600 horses, 200 mules, and 15 burros and 300 goats, and had an annual harvest of 1,000 US bushels (35 m^{3}) of wheat and 600 US bushels (21 m^{3}) bushels of corn.

=== Mexican Period ===
Following the independence of Mexico from Spain in 1821, the presidio was abandoned and the settlement was in ruins when settlers from the United States reached the Santa Cruz Valley in the late 1840s, no official garrison manned the fortress and it remained abandoned along with the settlement for most of the Mexican period. For a short while in 1846 during the Mexican–American War, Tubac was home to a large company of Mexican troops, over 200 men. The Mexicans had retreated from Fort Tucson just before the American Mormon Battalion captured it. After the war Tubac was abandoned until Americans traveling for the California Gold Rush decided to settle there instead.

In 1852, John Russell Bartlett visited Tubac, writing:

In a book of travels in a strange country, one is expected to describe every town he visits; but as for this God-forsaken place, when I have said that it contains a few dilapidated buildings, and an old church, with a miserable population, I have said about all.

=== American Period ===
Tubac officially became an American settlement in 1853 after the Gadsden Purchase. At this time Tubac was home to several dozen people and was a company town for the mining company of Charles D. Poston. The post was manned by a small team of militia and was attacked repeatedly by Apaches in the eighteenth century. The last attack was the Siege of Tubac in 1861. American militia and civilians were besieged in the fort until rescued by the Confederate States militia under Captain Granville H. Oury of Fort Tucson. Tubac was abandoned again after the siege but reoccupied by the United States Army during and after the American Civil War for several years. The main two original presidio buildings remained intact after the turn to the 20th century and are now tourist attractions. The presidio of Tubac was resettled in the 1880s and by the 1886 surrender of Geronimo, the Apache were no longer a threat to settlers in that part of Arizona. The fort was from that point not of military value in terms of strategic location.
