= History of Mexican Americans in Tucson =

Throughout its history, Tucson, Arizona has had a large and influential Mexican American community. Tucson was majority Mexican/Mexican American even by the early 20th century.

Most people of Mexican descent who have lived in Tucson for generations identify as Tucsonenses. This local identity stresses a connection to the city and influenced Thomas E. Sheridan to title his book, Los Tucsonenses.

By 2018, the city's demographics have again changed and the percentage of Mexican and Mexican Americans are moving toward becoming the majority population.

In 2019, Regina Romero was elected Tucson's mayor. No Mexican American had held that office since 1875, when Arizona was still a territory and Estevan Ochoa won the mayoral race by a landslide.

== See also ==
- History of Tucson, Arizona
- History of Mexican Americans in Phoenix
