= History of Tucson, Arizona =

The history of Tucson, Arizona began thousands of years ago. Paleo-Indians practiced plant husbandry and hunted game in the Santa Cruz River Valley from 10,000 or earlier BCE. Archaic peoples began making irrigation canals, some of the first in North America, around 1,200 BCE. The Hohokam people lived in the Tucson area from around 450–1450 CE in a complex agricultural society.

Jesuit missionary Eusebio Francisco Kino founded the Mission San Xavier del Bac in 1700. Through the 1700s, Spanish missionaries tried to get the Native Americans to convert to Catholicism and a Spanish lifestyle. The Spanish built a fort at Tubac in 1751. It was moved to Tucson in 1775 where Hugo O'Conor, an Irishman working for the Spanish crown, officially founded Presidio San Augustin del Tucson.

The Spanish stayed in the area, fighting down repeated attacks on the fort by Apache warriors. In 1821, Tucson became part of the new state of Sonora in Mexico, who had won independence from Spain. In 1853, Tucson, along with much of the surrounding area, was purchased from Mexico by the United States in the Gadsden Purchase and was made part of the New Mexico Territory. President Lincoln created the Arizona Territory in 1863, and Tucson was named capitol from 1867 to 1877. On February 14, 1912, Arizona became the 48th state in the United States.

== Native Americans ==
Tucson was probably first visited by Paleo-Indians, known to have been in southern Arizona about 12,000 years ago. Recent archaeological excavations near the Santa Cruz River have located a village site dating from 2100 BCE. The floodplain of the Santa Cruz River was extensively farmed during the Early Agricultural Period, circa 1200 BCE to 150 CE. These people constructed irrigation canals and grew corn, beans, and other crops while gathering wild plants and hunting. The Early Ceramic period occupation of Tucson saw the first extensive use of pottery vessels for cooking and storage. The groups designated as the Hohokam lived in the area from 600 to 1450 CE and are known for their vast irrigation canal systems and their red-on-brown pottery.

Jesuit missionary Eusebio Francisco Kino visited the Santa Cruz River valley in 1692, and founded the Mission San Xavier del Bac in 1700 about 7 mi (11 km) upstream from the site of the settlement of Tucson. A separate Convento settlement was founded downstream along the Santa Cruz River, near the base of what is now "A" mountain. Hugo O'Conor, the founding father of the city of Tucson, Arizona authorized the construction of a military fort in that location, Presidio San Agustín del Tucsón, on August 20, 1775 (near the present downtown Pima County Courthouse). During the Spanish period of the presidio, attacks such as the Second Battle of Tucson were repeatedly mounted by Apaches. Eventually the town came to be called "Tucson" and became a part of the state of Sonora after Mexico gained independence from the Kingdom of Spain and its Spanish Empire in 1821.

== Mexican period ==
In 1821 Mexico gained independence from Spain. The Mexican Occidente state borders extended further north to include the town of Tucsón. In 1853 the United States acquired from Mexico, in the Gadsden Purchase, a strip of land that included Tucson. The goal was to enable the construction of a transcontinental railroad along a deep southern route by the Southern Pacific Railroad.

In 1846, the Mormon Battalion marched across southern Arizona along the San Pedro River, south of Tucson. They encountered wild cattle along the banks of the San Pedro, where several bulls charged their column, tipping over wagons and killing mules and injuring two soldiers. The soldiers shot and killed a number of the wild cattle, and sarcastically named the encounter the “Battle of the Bulls.” On December 16, 1846, they marched into Tucson. The smaller Mexican garrison of Fort Tucson quickly fled without conflict. A brief occupation ensued and then the Mormons continued their march to Alta California.

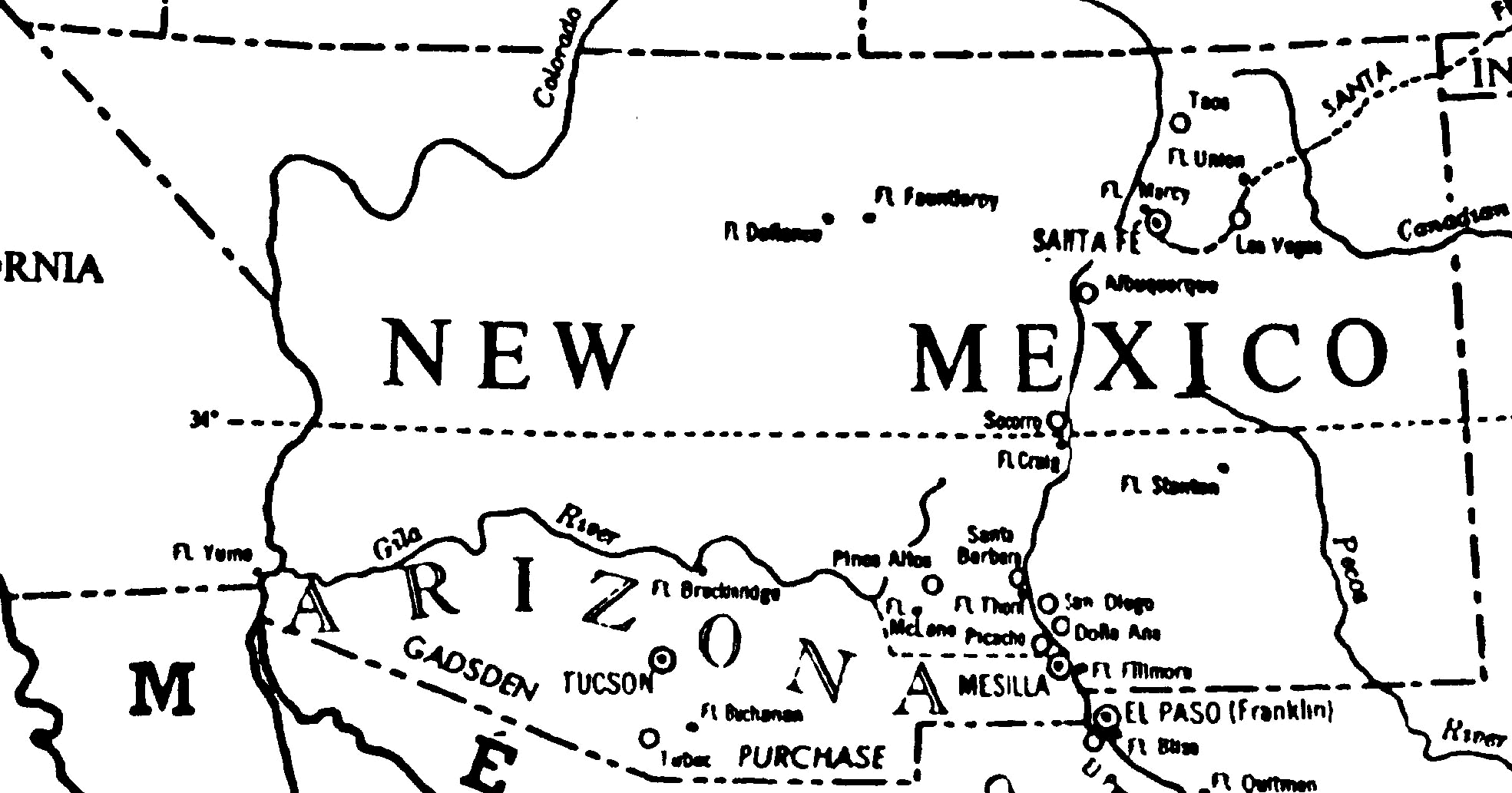
Map of New Mexico Territory, showing Traditional Arizona and the 34th parallel

== Early United States and Confederate States period ==
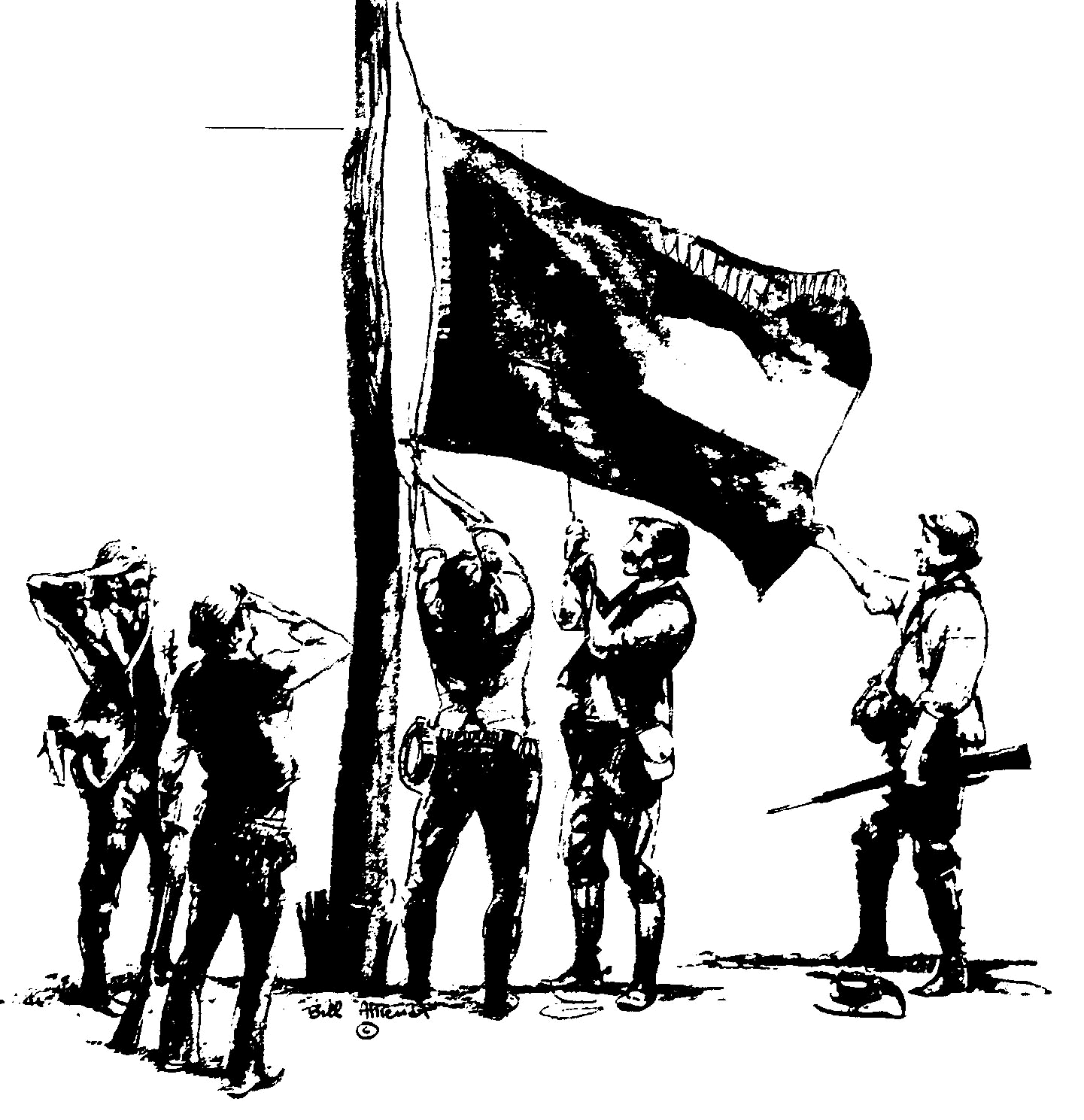
Raising the Confederate flag in Tucson

In July 1861, after the American Civil War began, a force of Texan cavalry and Arizonan militia under Lt. Colonel John Baylor conquered the southern New Mexico territory, including Mesilla and Tucson on August 1, 1861, and the victorious Baylor proclaimed the existence of a Confederate Arizona Territory, which comprised the area defined in the Tucson convention the previous year, with Tucson as its capital. He appointed himself permanent governor.

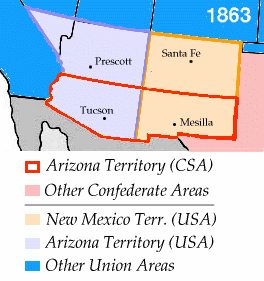

The proposal to organize the territory was passed by the Confederate Congress in early 1862 and proclaimed by President Jefferson Davis on February 14, 1862. Efforts by the Confederacy to secure control of the region led to the New Mexico Campaign. Later in 1862, Baylor was ousted as governor of the territory by Davis, and the Confederate loss at the Battle of Glorieta Pass forced their retreat. The following month, a small Confederate picket force defeated a Union cavalry patrol north of Tucson at the Battle of Picacho Pass. Despite the Union retreat, Tucson eventually was captured by the California Column.

== Later territorial period ==
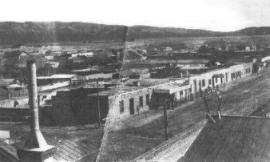
Tucson's Stone Avenue in 1880

Tucson, and all of Arizona, remained part of the New Mexico Territory until February 24, 1863, when the Arizona Organic Act passed the Senate forming the Arizona Territory. In 1867, the territorial capital was moved to Tucson from Prescott, where it remained until 1877. In 1885, the University of Arizona was founded in Tucson – it was situated in the countryside, outside the city limits of the time.

During the territorial and early statehood periods, Tucson was Arizona's largest city and commercial and railroad center, while Phoenix was the seat of state government (beginning in 1889). Between 1910 and 1920, Phoenix surpassed Tucson in population and has continued to outpace Tucson in growth. However, both Tucson and Phoenix have experienced among the highest growth rates in the United States.

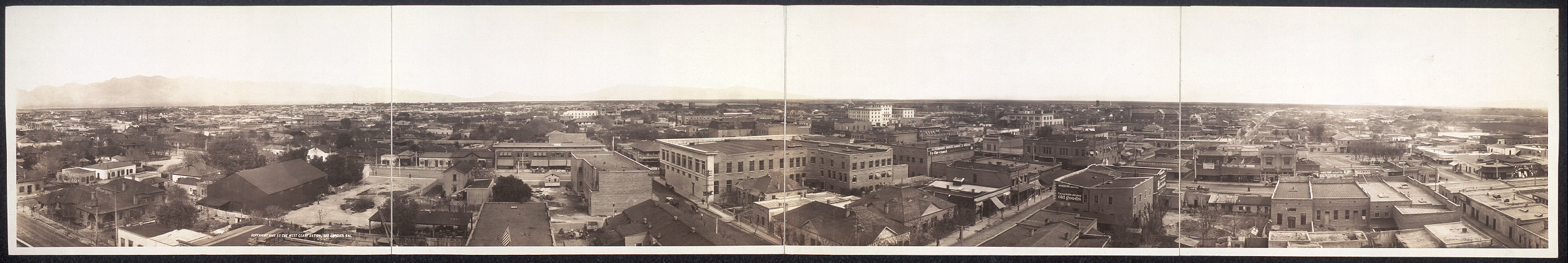
Panoramic view of downtown Tucson in 1909

== Modern period ==
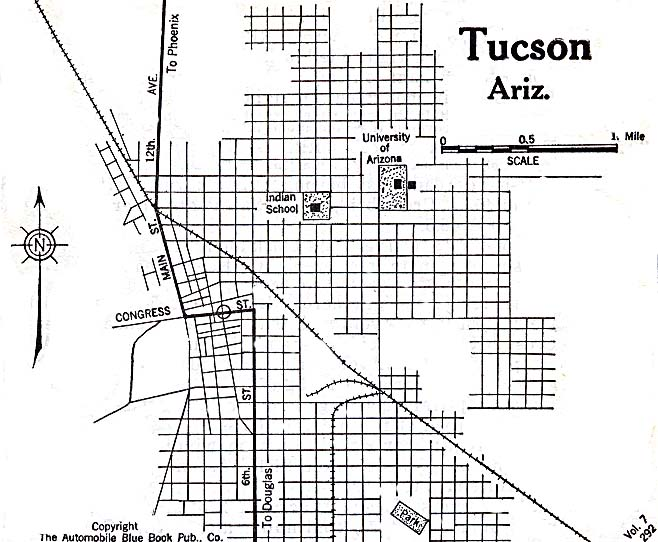
Map of Tucson in 1920

By 1900, 7,531 people lived in the city. The population increased gradually to 13,913 in 1910, 20,292 in 1920, and 36,818 in 1940. In 2006 the population of Pima County, in which Tucson is located, passed one million while the City of Tucson's population was 535,000.

=== Crime ===
In late January 1934, five members of the Dillinger gang, including John Dillinger, himself, were arrested in Tucson. They were five of the top six names on the FBI's first Public Enemy list. A fire allowed firemen to discover their identity and the police promptly arrested Harry Pierpont, Charles Makley, Russell Clark, Ed Shouse, and Dillinger. The police found the gang in possession of over $25,000 in cash, three sub-machine guns, and five machine guns. Tucson celebrates the historic arrest with an annual "Dillinger Days" festival, the highlight of which is a reenactment.

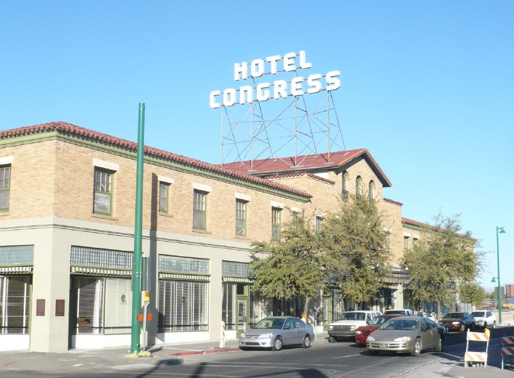
Hotel Congress, built in 1918 in downtown Tucson

=== Hospitals ===
In 1919, Lieutenant Neill MacArtan of the Army Medical Corps arrived in Tucson, Arizona, looking for a sanatorium site. He found nearly 700 veterans scattered in squalid conditions throughout the area and commenced a decade's struggle to build a southwestern veterans hospital. Tucson's success is the story of city officials and citizens volunteering, organizing, battling other contenders like Livermore, California, and lobbying Congress. Despite MacArtan's death from tuberculosis in 1922, Veterans Administration Hospital Number 51 opened at Pastime Park in 1928. Many TB sufferers and veterans who had been gassed in World War I and were in need of respiratory therapy came to Tucson after the war because of the clean, dry air.

=== Chinese Population ===
The Chinese came to Tucson with the construction of the Southern Pacific Railroad in 1880. Chinese and Mexican merchants and farmers transcended racial differences to form 'guanxi,' which were relations of friendship and trust. Chinese leased land from Mexicans, operated grocery stores, and aided compatriots attempting to enter the United States from Mexico after the Mexican Revolution in 1910. Chinese merchants supplied General John Pershing's army in its expedition against Pancho Villa. Successful Chinese in Tucson led a viable community based on social integration, friendship, and kinship. A representative community leader was Lee Wee Kwon, who arrived as a refugee from the Mexican civil war in 1917, and was a prominent grocer and community leader until his death in 1965.

=== World War II ===
During World War II (1941–45) Mexican-American community organizations were very active in patriotic efforts to support American troops abroad, and made efforts to support the war effort materially and to provide moral support for the young American men fighting the war, especially the young Mexican-American men from local communities. Some of the community projects were cooperative ventures in which members of both the Mexican-American and Anglo communities participated. Most efforts made in the Mexican-American community, however, represented localized American home front activities that were separate from the activities of the Anglo community.

Mexican-American women in Tucson organized to assist their servicemen and the war effort during World War II. An underlying goal of the Spanish-American Mothers and Wives Association was the reinforcement of the woman's role in Spanish-Mexican culture. The organization raised thousands of dollars, wrote letters, and joined in numerous celebrations of their culture and their support for Mexican-American servicemen. Membership reached over 300 during the war and eventually ended its existence in 1976.

== See also ==
- Timeline of Tucson, Arizona
- History of Mexican Americans in Tucson

== Bibliography ==
- Bufkin, Don. "From mud village to modern metropolis: The urbanization of Tucson." Journal of Arizona History 22.1 (1981): 63-98. online
- Devine, David. Tucson: A history of the Old Pueblo from the 1854 Gadsden Purchase (McFarland, 2025) online
- Dobyns, Henry F. Spanish Colonial Tucson (University of Arizona Press, 1976).
- Graye, Michelle B. Greetings from Tucson: A Postcard History of the Old Pueblo (MBG, 2004) online; many in color.
- Greenleaf, Cameron, and Andrew Wallace. "Tucson: Pueblo, Presidio, and American City: A synopsis of its history." Arizoniana 3.2 (1962): 18-27. online
- Logan, Michael F. Desert cities: the environmental history of Phoenix and Tucson (University of Pittsburgh Press, 2012).
- Luckingham, Bradford. The urban southwest: a profile history of Albuquerque, El Paso, Phoenix, Tucson (Texas Western Press, 1982).
- Nequette, Anne M., and R. Brooks Jeffery. A guide to Tucson architecture (University of Arizona Press, 2021) online.
- Officer, James. "Historical factors in interethnic relations in the community of Tucson." Arizoniana 1.3 (1960): 12-16. online
- Serrat-Capdevila, Aleix. "The Tucson basin: Natural and human history." in Water Bankruptcy in the Land of Plenty (CRC Press, 2017): 27-44.
- Sheridan, Thomas E. Los Tucsonenses: The Mexican Community in Tucson, 1854–1941 (University of Arizona Press, 1992) online.
- Sonnichsen, Charles Leland. Tucson: the life and times of an American city (University of Oklahoma Press, 1987). online
- Sonnichsen, C. L. "Hard Times in Tucson." Journal of Arizona History 22.1 (1981): 23-62. online the 1930s
- Wang, Wensheng. "Chinese Americans in the Tucson Community Their History, Their Contributions." Chinese Studies in History 34.3 (2001): 82-96. online
