= Third Battle of Tucson (1782) =

Part of the Apache-Mexico Wars

Coordinates: 32.2258°N 110.9757°W

- Part of the Apache–Mexico Wars
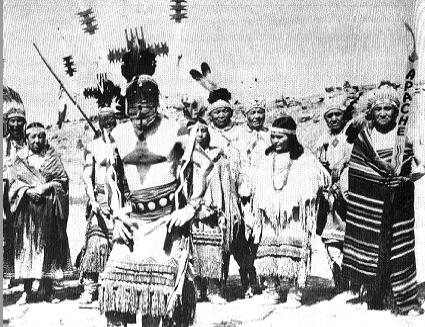
- A group of Apaches in their traditional tribal clothing, year unknown.
Date	December 25, 1782
Location	Tucson, Arizona
Result	Spanish victory

Belligerents
Spain	Apache

Commanders and leaders
(Spain) Pedro Allande y Saabedra	Unknown

Strength
~60 cavalry 1 fort	~200 warriors

Casualties and losses
Unknown	6 killed

The Third Battle of Tucson took place during the Spanish colonization of Sonora, now the present day Arizona in the United States. The battle pitched the Apache warriors against the Spanish cavalry garrison of Tucson.

== Battle ==
On Christmas Day, December 25, 1782, Apache attacked Tucson for a third time, specifically to raid the cattle herds. General Pedro Allande y Saabedra described the attack later:

"More than 200 seized the cattle which were recovered by the parties of troops which he dispatched in their pursuit inasmuch as the wound in his leg was still open. They were able to kill six of the Apache aggressors, whose heads were cut off."

The heads were later placed along the presidio walls, meant to scare off potential threats. Specific Spanish casualties are not known. Apaches would attack again, two years later, to try a capture Spanish livestock again.

== See also ==
- History of Tucson, Arizona
- Siege of Tubac
- American Indian Wars
- Apache Wars
- Navajo Wars
