= Southern Arizona =

Region of Arizona, United States

Coordinates: 33.40°N 112.51°W

Southern Arizona is the area of Arizona south of the Gila River, roughly corresponding to the area from the 1854 Gadsden Purchase (shown on the map in yellow with present-day state boundaries and cities)

Southern Arizona is a region of the United States comprising the southernmost portion of the State of Arizona, being roughly coterminous with the area known as Traditional Arizona. It sometimes goes by the name Gadsden or Baja Arizona, which means "Lower Arizona" in Spanish.

== Geography ==
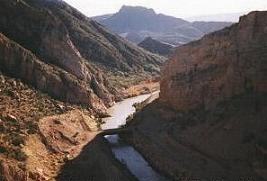
The Gila River is generally considered the northern boundary of southern Arizona

Although Southern Arizona's boundaries are not well-defined, it is generally considered to include all areas south of the Gila River but sometimes only Cochise County, Pima County and Santa Cruz County, anchored by the city of Tucson. Other cities and large towns in Southern Arizona include Ajo, Casa Grande, Gila Bend, Oro Valley, Sierra Vista, Yuma, and the border cities of Nogales and Douglas.

The populated areas of Southern Arizona include the major U.S. Army post of Fort Huachuca and Davis–Monthan Air Force Base of the U.S. Air Force.

The most major scientific site of Southern Arizona is the set of several astronomical observatories of the Kitt Peak National Observatory, a reasonable distance west-southwest of Tucson.

Southern Arizona is the location of several large national monuments protecting the scenery, wildlife, and archaeological sites of Southern Arizona, and the Saguaro National Park, which stands on two large sections of land, one west of the Tucson metropolitan area and the other one east of Tucson.

The region includes several small mountain ranges including the Chiricahua Mountains, Huachuca Mountains, Santa Ritas, the Santa Catalinas, the Rincons, the Piñalenos, and others. As surprising as it might seem, some of these mountains are high enough, cold enough, and wet enough in the wintertime to provide alpine skiing at regular ski resorts, with ski lifts, not very distant from cities such as Tucson.

== Transportation ==
Significant distances requiring transportation in Southern Arizona are generally traveled by highway and the railroad. Southern Arizona is the location of the major transcontinental Interstate highway Interstate 10 from the border with New Mexico westward through Tucson, and then continuing northwest via Casa Grande to the Phoenix–Scottsdale–Mesa metropolis. Also, running westward from Casa Grande is Interstate 8, which goes via Yuma into California, crossing the Colorado River. Finally, the short Interstate 19 runs south from Tucson to Nogales, Arizona, and a major border crossing into Mexico. In addition, the much older Federal highway, U.S. Route 80, crosses Southern Arizona from east to west from the New Mexico border, nearly to the California border, and formerly into California to the Pacific Ocean. However, its westernmost stretch has been replaced by Interstate 8, which was built on top of it and its right-of-way.

A Transcontinental Railroad crosses Southern Arizona via Tucson and Phoenix. Also, there is a major railroad south from Northern Arizona, via Phoenix, Casa Grande, and Tucson, to Nogales, where it crosses the border and meets the Mexican railroads.

The primary major airport of southern Arizona, Tucson International Airport, is located just south of Tucson.

For public transit, the region is served by Valley Metro route 685, which connects the region to Phoenix, and Sun Tran route 486, which connects the region to Tucson.

== History ==
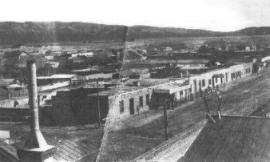
Stone Avenue in the year 1880 in Tucson, southern Arizona's largest city

Southern Arizona has been inhabited by human beings for several millennia. The Hohokam were the principal Pre-Columbian inhabitants of the area. In more recent times, the dominant indigenous group of Native Americans have been the O'odham tribe, which continues to reside in this area in their traditional homeland.

Several Spanish missions were established in the early 18th century by Father Eusebio Francisco Kino in what was then known as the Pimería Alta. After the Mexican–American War of 1846–47, much of Southern Arizona was purchased by the United States from Mexico for $15,000,000 in the Gadsden Purchase of 1854.

More recently, Southern Arizona played an important role during the Cold War. Davis-Monthan AFB was the home base of an air force wing of 18 heavy Titan II Intercontinental Ballistic Missiles dispersed over a wide area of launch sites – south, southwest, and southeast of Tucson. Due to their advancing age and the advent of several important Strategic Nuclear Weapons Reduction treaties, all of these missiles were retired from service by the mid-1980s. All but one of their launch silos and command shelters were demolished with explosives. The remaining site, Titan II ICBM Site 571-7, about 25 miles (40 km) south of Tucson on Interstate 19, serves as the Titan Missile Museum, a National Historic Landmark.

== Secession ==
Beginning in 1987, a group of southern Arizonans have considered seceding from the rest of Arizona to form a new U.S. state, potentially named Baja Arizona or Gadsden. A political push to that effect began in February, 2011, led by a group of attorneys largely in opposition to what they perceived as a nativist, conservative dominance in the Phoenix area in contrast to the Democrats of the south. The organizers of this movement had aimed to hold a referendum vote on the matter in 2012 in Pima County (and, possibly, Santa Cruz County and Cochise County). As of 2013, no ballot initiatives had been generated.
