= First Battle of Tucson =

Part of the Apache-Mexico Wars

Coordinates: 32.224°N 110.973°W

- Part of the Apache-Mexico Wars
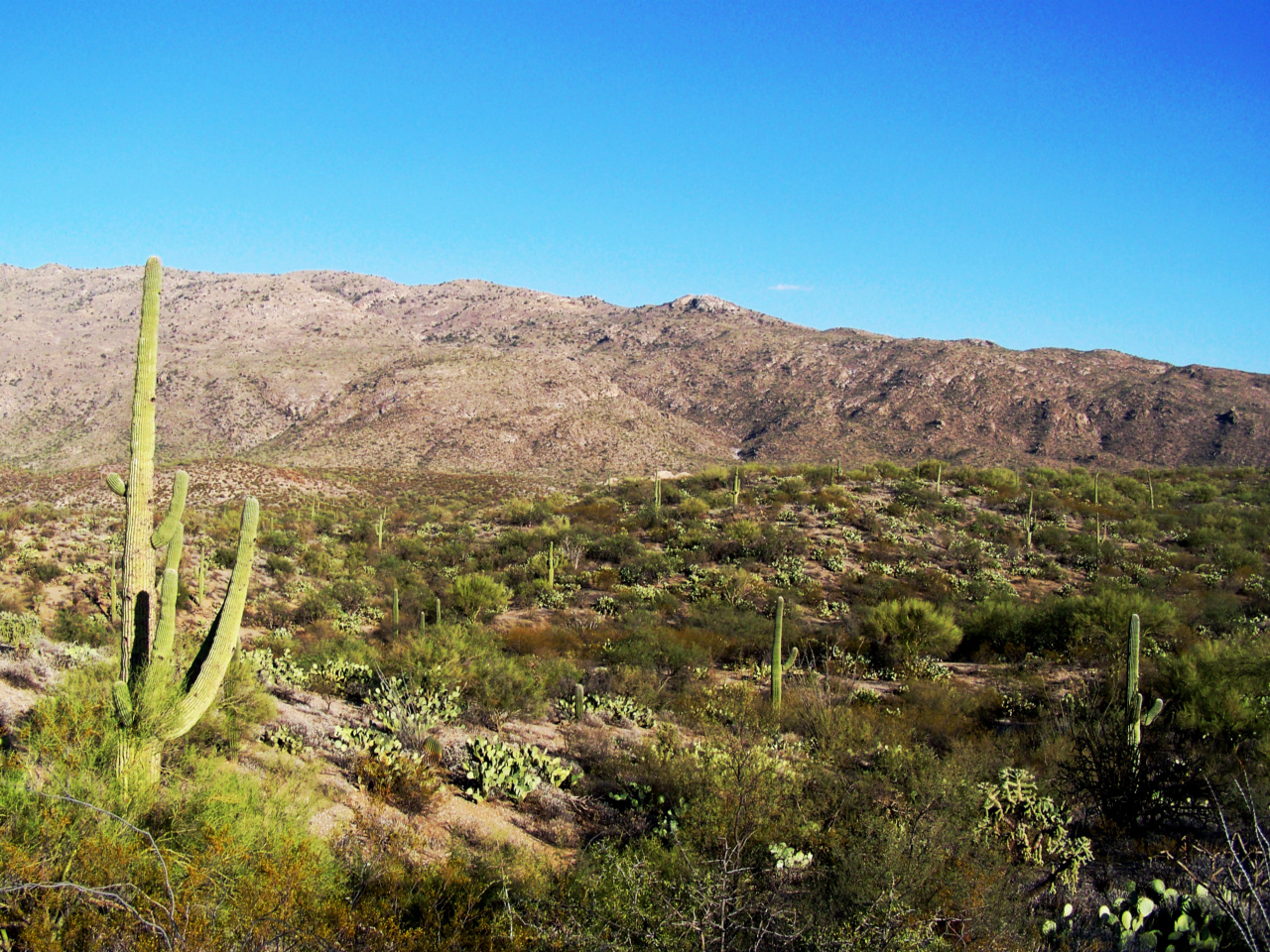
- The Sonoran Desert, outside Tucson.
Date	December 9, 1779
Location	Tucson, Sonora, New Spain; Modern Day: Tucson, Arizona
Result	Spanish victory

Belligerents
Spain	Apache

Commanders and leaders
(Spain) Pedro Allande y Saabedra	Quilcho

Strength
15 cavalry 1 fort	~350 warriors

The First Battle of Tucson was a confrontation at Tucson, Arizona on December 6, 1779, as part of the Apache-Mexico Wars. Captain Pedro Allande y Saabedra with a force of only fifteen men defeated an army of around 350 strong.

== Battle ==
Not much is known about the first battle at Tucson. An Apache force, which Captain Allande estimated as 350 warriors, approached the Spanish post of Fort Tucson itself. The captain formed a command of fifteen men and engaged the enemy. The Spanish lancers defeated the Apaches in a long running battle. Allande cut off and brought back the head of a slain chieftain and carried it on a lance as a trophy. After waving the head at the surviving Apaches they fled the battlefield, abandoning their plunder of stolen livestock. The Spaniards reportedly killed and wounded several Apache men, including a brother of Chief Quilcho. Exact numbers of casualties are unknown.

== See also ==
- Siege of Tubac
- American Indian Wars
- Apache Wars
- Navajo Wars
- History of Tucson, Arizona
