= Presidio de San Bernardino =

Historic site in Cochise County, Arizona

Coordinates: 31.3166°N 109.2500°W

- Douglas, Arizona

Site information
- Type: Army fortification
- Controlled by: Arizona

Site history
- Built by: Spain
- In use: 1776–1780, 1883

Garrison information
- Occupants: (Spain) Spanish Army; United States Army

The Presidio de San Bernardino, or Camp San Berdardino Springs was originally the site of a Spanish fortress built in 1776 and abandoned in 1780. It was located a few miles east of present-day Douglas, Arizona (Gerald 1968). In 1883, a temporary post was established by the United States Army at or near the presidio site and was known as Camp San Bernardino Springs. Camp Douglas was built next to Douglas in 1910 and should not be confused with the earlier posts or Camp San Bernardino Ranch, which was built near Bernardino, Arizona in 1911.
