= Battle of Dragoon Springs =

Battle of Dragoon Springs may refer to two battles occurring in the Dragoon Mountains of New Mexico Territory (US)/Confederate Arizona (CS), modern-day Cochise County, Arizona:

- First Battle of Dragoon Springs, May 5, 1862
- Second Battle of Dragoon Springs, May 9, 1862
