= Capture of Tucson (1862) =

1862 Union capture of Tucson during the American Civil War

- Part of the Trans-Mississippi Theater of the American Civil War
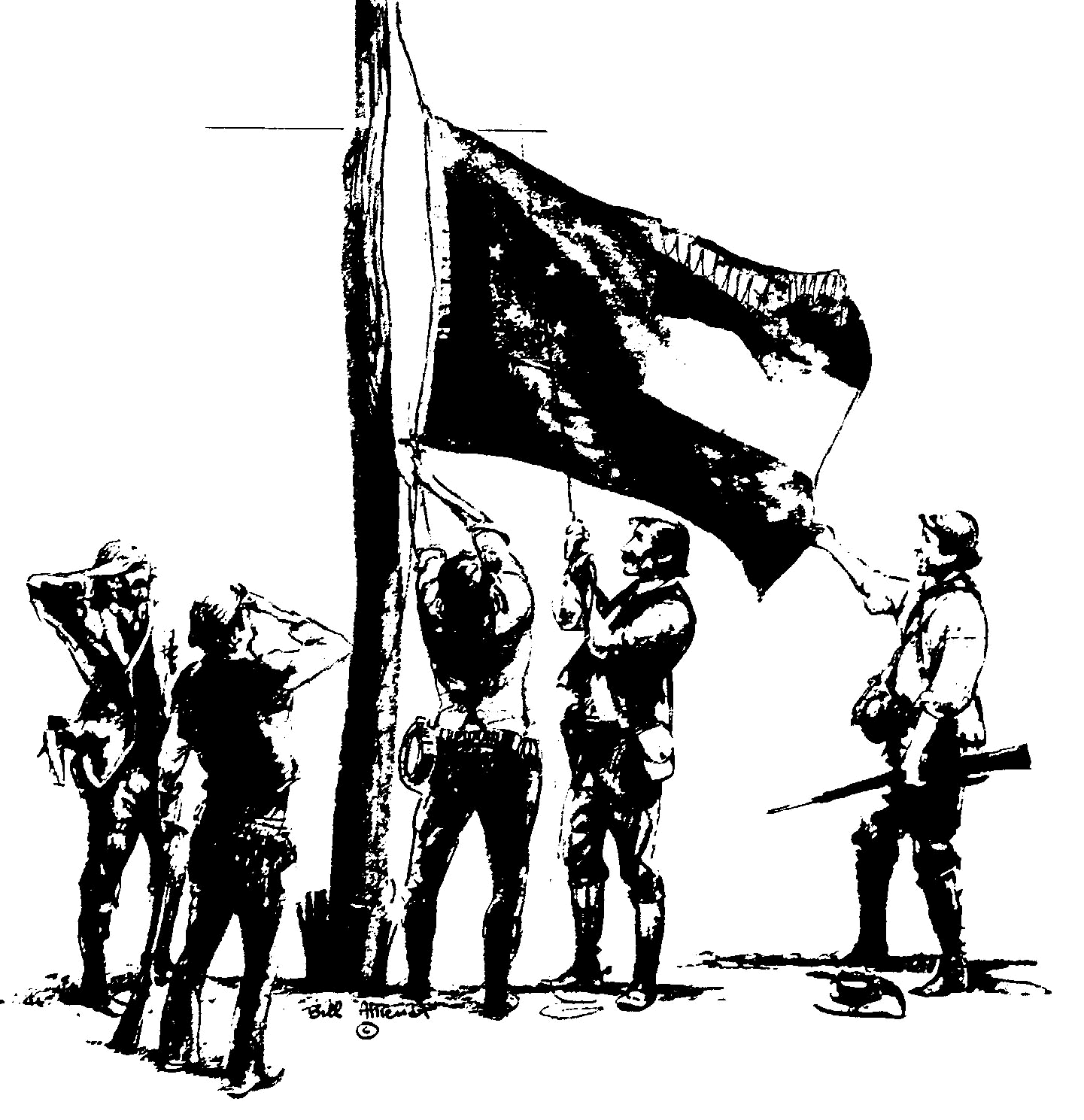
- Raising the Confederate flag in Tucson, March 1, 1862
- Date: May 20, 1862; 164 years ago
- Location: Tucson, Arizona Territory, Confederate States (present-day Tucson, Arizona, United States); 32°13′18″N 110°55′35″W
- Participants: Company B, 1st California Cavalry Regiment
- Outcome: Union occupation of Tucson, 1862-65

Union forces entered Tucson on May 20, 1862, with a force of 2,000 men without firing a shot.

== Background ==
Just prior to the American Civil War in the late 1850s, the cities of Tucson and Mesilla in southern New Mexico Territory petitioned the United States government to create a separate Territory of Arizona. The proposal was defeated after representatives from the Northern "free" states and the Southern "slave" states could not agree on how to divide New Mexico Territory. Southerners wanted an east–west division, whereas Northerners favored a north–south division of the territory. After the war began, the Confederacy established the Arizona Territory in February 1862 using the east–west boundary. Subsequently, the United States created Arizona Territory in 1863 using the current state boundary. Anglo-Arizonans had hoped the creation of a new territory would strengthen their communications with the east and allow for more military aid. Apaches had been fighting a bloody war in the region, leaving Tucson surrounded by occupied Apache land. Only Tucson's old presidio walls protected the population from harm. When Union troops left Arizona to fight in the South and the Butterfield Overland Mail stations were abandoned, the residents of the region were left with no military support for protection against the Apache.

After the arrival of a Confederate force from Texas in mid-1861, the Confederates established small militia garrisons in Tucson, Mesilla, Pinos Altos and other towns in Confederate Arizona. Although these militiamen would fight the Apache successfully in several different engagements, more military strength was needed to hold on to the territory. In early 1862, just before the first Confederate capture of Albuquerque in New Mexico Territory, General Henry Hopkins Sibley ordered Captain Sherod Hunter of Tennessee to proceed to Tucson with a small company of Confederate Arizona Rangers from Dona Ana (New Mexico) and Texas cavalry. Jack Swilling was a member of the Tucson reinforcement; he would go on to found the future state capital of Phoenix in 1867. The force consisted of about seventy-five men. Captain Hunter's orders were to establish a military alliance with the Pima (Akimel O'odham) and to watch for the advance of the California Volunteers. This Union force would begin its march from Fort Yuma, California, and eventually capture Mesilla and Franklin (El Paso), Texas. Colonel James Reily accompanied Captain Hunter when he left for Tucson. Colonel Reily commanded an escort of twenty men of the Pinos Altos Arizona Guards, another Confederate Arizona militia company. The Arizona Guards were composed primarily of men who left their homes around Tubac and Tucson following the Siege of Tubac in August 1861. About 100 Confederates arrived in Tucson on February 28, 1862, where they joined with the small Tucson militia, numbering about twenty-five men. Other than this force of approximately 100 cavalrymen, additional military support from the South never arrived. The formal flag-raising occurred on March 1, after which Colonel Reily and his escort went south to Sonora, Mexico for a mission of diplomacy. In early May, the garrison of Tucson fought two battles with the Apache while foraging for supplies in the Dragoon Mountains. The first engagement was a defeat for the rebels and the second was a victory. After the skirmish at Stanwix Station, the Battle of Picacho Peak, and the capture of a Union squad in the Pima villages, Colonel James Henry Carleton and his army of over 2,000 Californians occupied abandoned Fort Breckinridge to the northeast of Tucson. On May 14, the Californians began their march to Tucson from the fort. That same day, Sherrod Hunter ordered the evacuation of Tucson. He left ten of his militia behind under the command of Lieutenant James Henry Tevis. Their orders were to observe the Union approach.

== Capture ==
On May 20, 1862, Captain Emil Fritz with his Company B, 1st California Cavalry Regiment, entered Tucson, not approaching from the west as the Confederates had expected, but from the north and east via the Cañada del Oro. Captain Fritz with part of his company entered from the east side of the town, while Lieutenant Juan F. Guirado with the remainder of the company entered from the north. Lieutenant Tevis, who had been watching the western approach, was completely surprised by Lieutenant Guirado's sudden appearance from the Cañada del Oro, and narrowly avoided capture by the Union forces. Lieutenant Tevis beat a hasty retreat to the south and then east along the old Overland Mail Route in the direction of Mesilla. The California Volunteers secured Tucson without firing a single shot and returned the Stars-and-Stripes to the city after a Confederate occupation that had lasted only 80 days.

== Aftermath ==
When Captain Hunter arrived in Mesilla on May 27, his company, along with the Arizona Rangers and the Arizona Guards, were formed into Lieutenant Colonel Philemon Herbert's battalion of Arizona Cavalry. The Arizonans ceased being militia and officially became Confederate soldiers under General Henry Sibley. After the Battle of Glorieta Pass and the retreat of General Sibley's army, the Arizona Cavalry battalion was ordered to remain behind to hold on to Mesilla and the surrounding valley. Men under Sherod Hunter fought with New Mexican militia near Mesilla on June 1, 1862. The skirmish ended with no known casualties on either side and reports indicate a Union victory due to the loss of Confederate horses and equipment at the battle, the rebels retreated from Mesilla a few days later.

When the Arizona Cavalry withdrew into Texas, they were some of the last Confederate soldiers to leave Confederate Arizona. Though the Confederates, due to lack of manpower, failed to hold Arizona, the Arizonans themselves achieved their main goal: the creation of a territory separate from that of New Mexico Territory. As mentioned previously, the United States established Arizona Territory with Tucson as the capital in 1863, using a north–south boundary. The towns of Mesilla, Pinos Altos and others were not included in the new Arizona Territory, instead they remained part of New Mexico Territory and are now within the present-day state of New Mexico. The Confederate occupation of Arizona prompted a return of Union forces to the region in order to reassert Federal government control, thus providing Arizona the military support necessary for protection against Apaches. Indeed, the California Column remained on guard in Arizona until relieved by the Regular Army of the United States in the spring of 1866, making them the last volunteer forces to be mustered out of Federal service in the American Civil War.

== See also ==
- History of Tucson, Arizona
