= Siege of Tubac =

Event during the Apache Wars in Arizona

Coordinates: 31°37′32″N 111°3′7″W

- Part of the American Civil War; Apache Wars
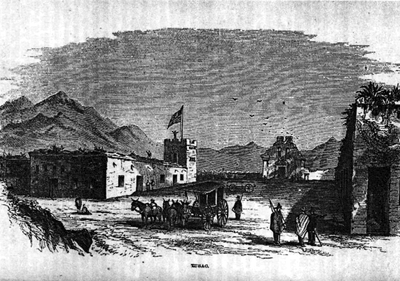
- Tubac in 1869, as a U.S. Army fort.
Date	Four days in early August, 1861
Location	Tubac, Arizona Territory

Belligerents
Confederate States	Apache

Commanders and leaders
G. H. Oury	Unknown

Strength
~25 militia 1 fort	~200 warriors

The siege of Tubac was a siege during the Apache Wars between settlers and militia of Confederate Arizona and the Chiricahua Apaches. The battle took place at Tubac in present-day southern Arizona. The actual dates of this engagement have been lost to time.

== Background ==
Apache warriors, over 200 strong, attacked Tubac sometime in early August 1861 and initiated a siege on one side of the presidio. Mexican bandits occupied the other side but stayed out of the major fighting. The towns people fought the Apaches for three days until sending a dispatch rider to Tucson, requesting reinforcements.

A force of 25 militiamen, carrying a Confederate flag and commanded by Captain G. H. Oury, arrived at the town and fought off the final assault. The Apaches withdrew out of close range but continued to lay siege by stopping the ability of the militia to escape. Eventually, food and ammunition became short, and the garrison, women and children chose to flee to avoid being completely massacred by the overwhelming Apache warriors.

The Arizonans escaped successfully after another skirmish on the last night, leaving Tubac to be burned by the Natives and plundered by the Mexican bandits. The Americans headed back to Tucson, to the north, having completed their objective of rescuing the besieged Tubacans. The casualties of the engagement are unknown.

== Aftermath ==
The Tubacans, with their town virtually gone, left Tucson at about August 15, 1861. Their destination was the Rio Grande, east of Mesilla. Before completing their journey, the Arizonans would be attacked again by Apaches at Cookes Canyon. The battle in Cookes Canyon was followed by the Battle of the Florida Mountains.

Charles D. Poston was one of the men who left Tubac as result of the siege. Poston, a Republican, supported the creation of an Arizona Territory separate from New Mexico Territory, which he discussed with President Abraham Lincoln after leaving Tubac.

After the Civil War, Tubac was briefly home to a command of United States troops, but no population existed. The town was abandoned into the 1880s. By 1908, Tubac was being rebuilt but still had a very small population of less than 200. As of today, only about 1,000 people reside in the town.

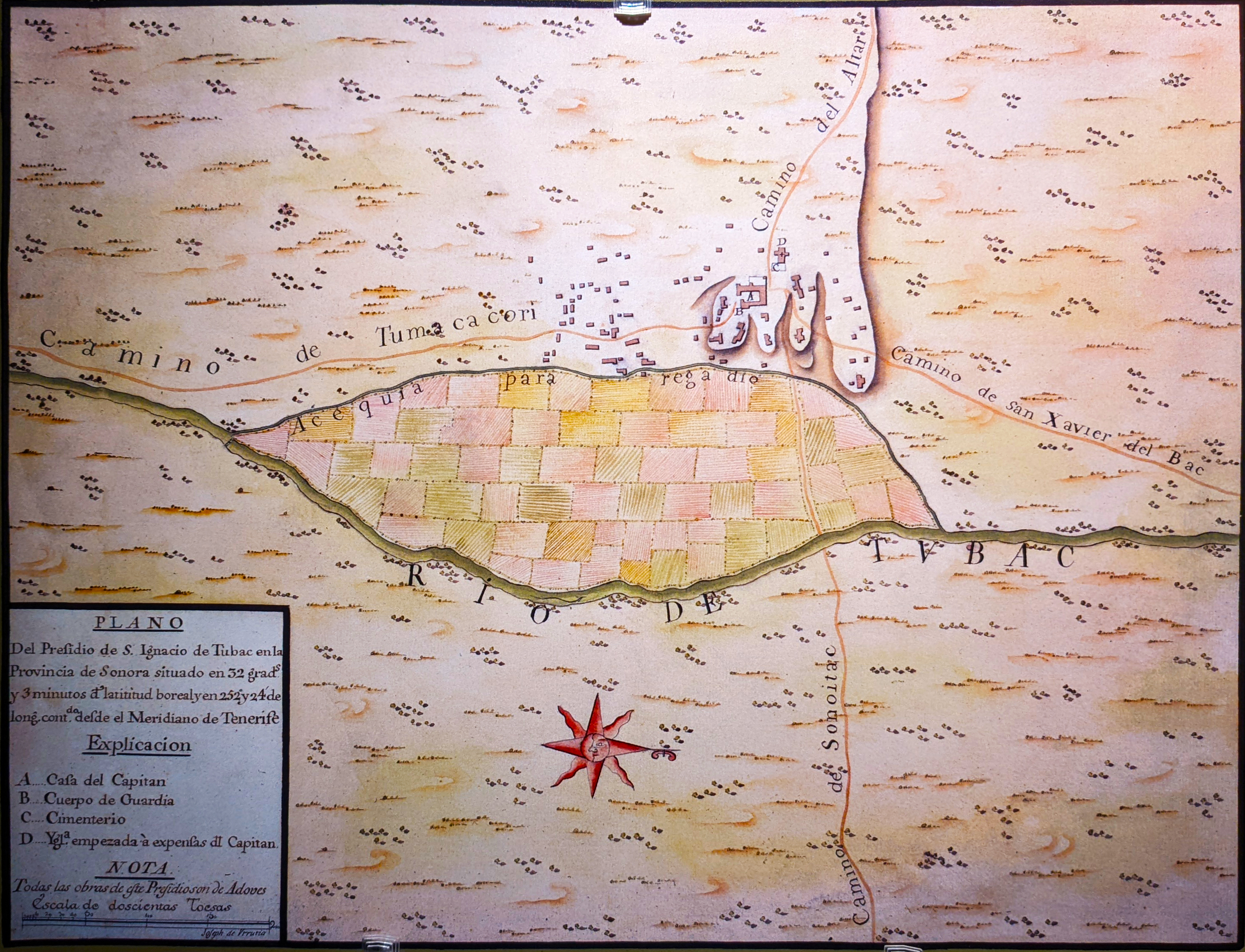
An early map of Tubac and surroundings.

== See also ==
- American Indian Wars
- First Battle of Tucson
- Second Battle of Tucson
- Third Battle of Tucson
- Fourth Battle of Tucson
