= Apache–Mexico Wars =

Conflicts involving Apache Native Americans in New Spain and Mexican Republic

Apache-Mexico Wars
- Part of the Mexican Indian Wars
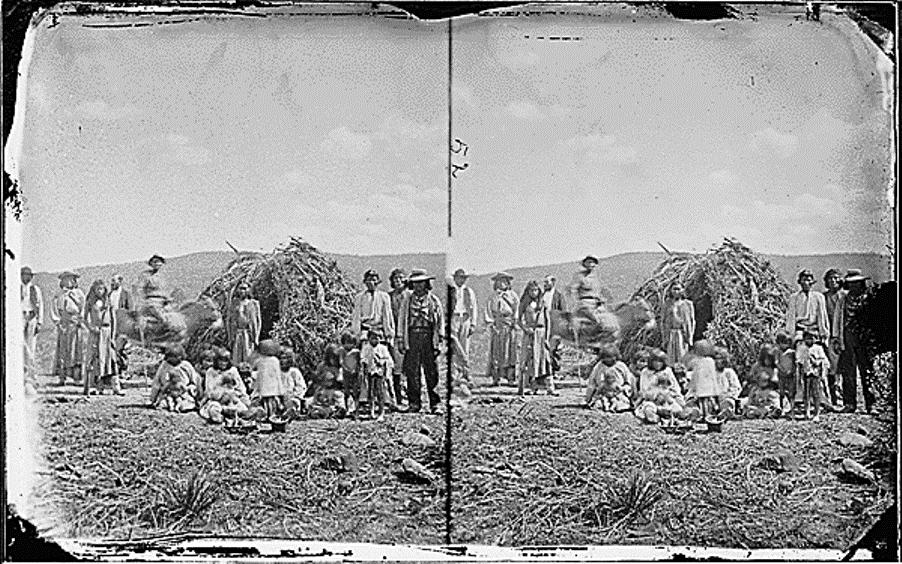
- A camp of the Coyotero Apache in 1873. Brush shelters, called wikiups, were typical, temporary homes for the nomadic Apache.
Date	1600s–1915
Location	Northwestern Mexico
Result	Spanish/Mexican victory

Belligerents
Kingdom of Spain (1600–1821); Mexico (1821–1915); Republic of Texas (1836–1846); United States (1850–1915); Confederate States (1861–1865)	Apache

The Apache–Mexico Wars, or the Mexican Apache Wars, refer to the conflicts between Spanish or Mexican forces and the Apache peoples. The wars began in the 1600s with the arrival of Spanish colonists in present-day New Mexico. War between the Mexicans and the Apache was especially intense from 1831 into the 1850s. Thereafter, Mexican operations against the Apache coincided with the Apache Wars of the United States, such as during the Victorio Campaign. Mexico continued to operate against hostile Apache bands as late as 1915.

== War with the Spanish ==
The Spanish first encountered the Apache, whom they called Querechos, in 1541 in the Texas panhandle. At the time the Apache were buffalo hunting nomads and semi-nomads who had trading relationships with the Pueblos of the Rio Grande valley. The early contacts were friendly, but in the 17th century, the relationship between Spaniard and Apache deteriorated because of slave raids by the Spaniards and Apache attacks on the Spanish and Pueblo settlements in New Mexico.

The Apache migrated south and west, under pressure from the Comanche who were also expanding southward. Being pushed off the buffalo-rich Great Plains into the more austere desert and mountains of the Southwest probably caused the Apache to become more dependent upon raiding for a livelihood. By 1692, they settled in the present-day state of Chihuahua, Mexico. They soon were also visiting Sonora and Coahuila and seem to have absorbed several other Indian peoples native to the future U.S.-Mexico border area, the Suma, Manso, Jano, and Jocome. Chihuahua, Sonora, and Coahuila were more populated and richer than the Spanish colonies in New Mexico, and Apache raiding soon became a serious problem. In 1737, a Spanish military officer said, "many mines have been destroyed, 15 large estancias [ranches] along the frontier have been totally destroyed, having lost two hundred head of cattle, mules, and horses; several missions have been burned and two hundred Christians have lost their lives to the Apache enemy, who sustains himself only with the bow and arrow, killing and stealing livestock."

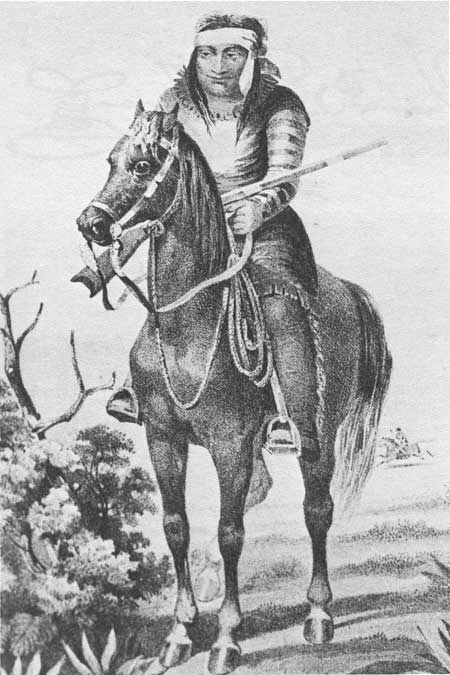
A Lipan Apache in 1857. The Lipan were the easternmost of the Apache, living in the San Antonio, Texas, area in the early 19th century.

The Spanish response to the Apache problem in the 1770s was to reorganize its frontier defenses, withdraw from some areas, establish a "cordon of presidios" (forts) along the northern frontier, undertake punitive missions against the Apache, usually with Indian allies, and encourage peace with the Apache. The chain of 18 presidios located about 100 miles (160 km) apart in Sonora, Chihuahua, Texas, New Mexico, and future Arizona was the backbone of the defense against Apache raids. In the late 18th century, presidios each had a complement of 43 soldiers, with the exceptions of Santa Fe, New Mexico, and San Antonio with 76 soldiers assigned to them and Janos and San Buenaventura, Chihuahua each with a complement of 144 soldiers. The 1,000 soldiers in the presidios were reinforced by local militia and Indian allies. The most prominent of the presidios was at Janos, Chihuahua Another, the Presidio San Augustin del Tucson became the most important Spanish settlement in Arizona.

The punitive missions of the Spanish against the Apache extracted a heavy toll of lives but were ineffective in halting Apache raids. The intensity of the conflict was at its peak from 1771 to 1776 when in Chihuahua and Coahuila "1,674 Spaniards were killed, 154 were captured, over one hundred ranches were abandoned, and over sixty-eight thousand animals were stolen." Many of the Spaniard deaths recorded were probably mestizos and Christian Indians. Apache casualties were also heavy. In October and November 1775, a Spanish military operation headed by Hugo O'Conor in New Mexico killed 132 Apache and took 104 prisoners.

In 1786, the Viceroy in Mexico City, Bernardo de Galvez, issued an Instrución to continue war with the Apache, but also to persuade them to make peace. Military operations intensified, but, at the same time, Apache who voluntarily surrendered and settled at the presidios were treated kindly and provided rations. Another factor inducing the Apache to make peace may have been the fact that New Mexico had made peace with the Comanche in 1786, and Comanche were now joining the Spanish in military operations against the Apache. During this time, the Spanish sold captured Apaches into slavery and sent them to Cuba. The Spanish would continue deporting Apaches to Cuba and central Mexico into the nineteenth century, a practice which Pekka Hämäläinen calls "New Spain's version of Indian removal." By 1790, most of the Apache bands, which had no central leadership, were at peace with the Spanish. By 1793, almost 2,000 Apache were settled at a dozen presidios, including 400 at Janos and 800 at El Norte (El Paso, Texas). The number of Apache still living in the mountains and deserts is unknown. Relative peace between the Apache and the Spaniards and Mexicans would endure until 1831.

== War with Mexico ==
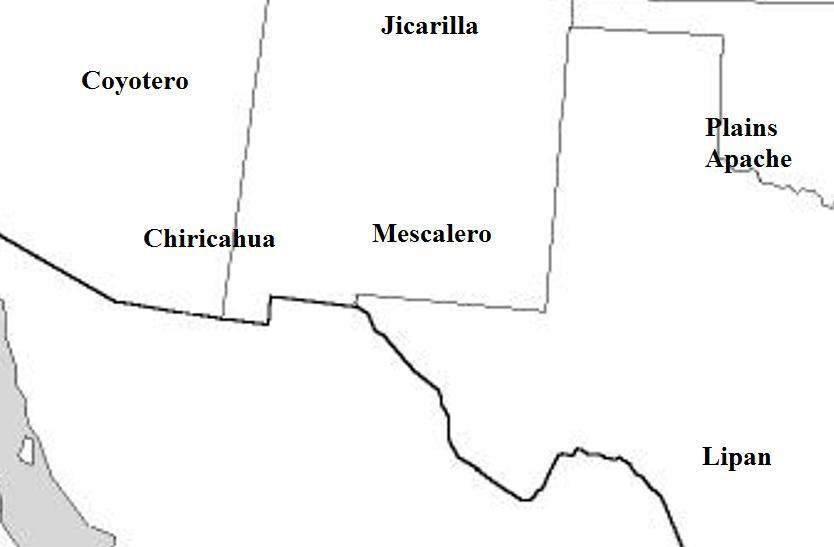
The approximate locations of the principal Apache tribes, ca. 1840. Most of the raids into Mexico were carried out by the Chiricahua and Mescalero.

When Mexico became independent in 1821 the long-standing peace with the Apache began to fall apart. The number of soldiers at the frontier presidios was reduced, as was the budget for supporting the soldiers and the Apache. The key element leading to war was that, in 1831, the Mexican government cut off food rations to Apaches settled near presidios. The 2,000 Apache at the presidios quickly departed, it being necessary for them to resume their hunting-gathering lifestyle if they were to survive. The military commander of Chihuahua declared war on the Apache on October 16, 1831, and initiated military action against them. Mexico, however, was ill-prepared for a war against the Apache. The two states most affected, Chihuahua and Sonora, operated almost independently of each other and the federal government. Sonora (which included Arizona at this time) had a thinly-scattered population of perhaps 50,000 people; Chihuahua had a more concentrated population of 134,000 and a better organized government.

The Apache tribes most involved in the war, the Chiricahua (called "Gileños" by Mexicans) and the Mescalero numbered only 2,500 to 3,000 people. Neither tribe had a central authority but consisted of a number of independent bands, numbering 100 to 500, each of which made their own decision concerning peace or war with the Mexicans. Bands would often unite temporarily to launch larger forces against the Mexicans, but most Apache raids were relatively small scale, involving a few dozen warriors. The Apache also negotiated separately with Mexican states and municipalities, carrying on war with some while at peace with others. Mexico's problem defeating the mobile and elusive Apache was exacerbated by the rising hostility of the Comanche, Kiowa and Kiowa-Apache who, especially in the 1840s and 1850s, launched large raids involving hundreds of men into northeastern Mexico from their safehaven on the Texas plains.(See: Comanche-Mexico Wars)

Apache raids beginning in 1831 occurred in fits and starts as bands and leaders, most prominently Juan José Compá, who was literate and spoke Spanish, alternately raided and responded to peace overtures from Mexican authorities. Most often the Apache objective in a raid was to steal livestock and other property; but a common Apache modus operandi was also to travel by horseback in small groups into Mexico, rendezvous with other groups, attack a settlement, kill the men and capture as many women, children, and livestock as desired, and then flee toward their homeland, setting ambushes along the way to discourage pursuit. The Apache avoided pitched battles unless they were superior in numbers or had the element of surprise.

However, after Mexican independence the resources and manpower devoted to the presidios declined. In Sonora, in 1833, the state government solicited public donations to bolster its defenses, and in 1834 briefly reduced salaries of all state officials by 10 to 33 percent to devote the money to enlisting more soldiers. In Chihuahua, in 1832, to supplement the presidios all civilian men were ordered to carry weapons at all times, all occupied places were ordered to be fortified, and local defense forces were organized. By the early 1840s Chihuahua had 1,500 soldiers under arms in addition to local defense forces. However, much of this force was devoted to protecting the eastern part of the state against Comanches rather than fighting the Apache.

== Scalp hunters ==
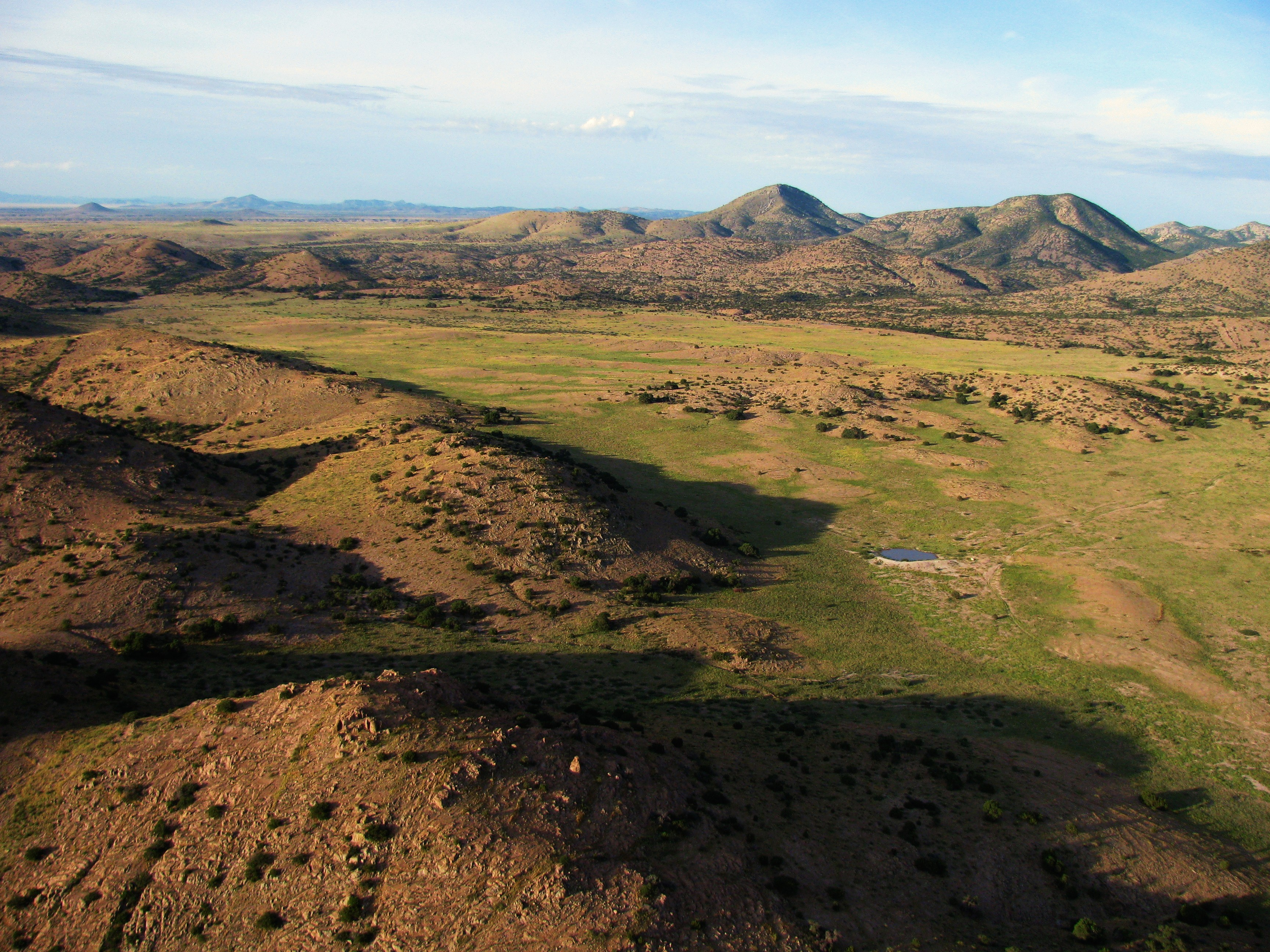
John Johnson's massacre of Apaches in 1837 took place near here in the Animas Valley of New Mexico. The landscape is typical of that inhabited by the Apache, a mix of desert plains and rugged mountains.

In 1835, the government of Sonora put a bounty on the Apache which, over time, evolved into a payment by the government of 100 pesos for each scalp of a male 14 or more years old. Later, Chihuahua offered the same bounty for males plus a bounty of 50 pesos for the capture of an adult female and 25 pesos for a child under 14. Bounty hunters were also allowed to keep any Apache property they captured. The bounty for one Apache male was more than many Mexicans and American workers earned in a full year. It is unclear, however, whether the scalp bounty was actually paid during the first few years.

A famous battle (or massacre) involved a United States citizen named John Johnson, resident in Sonora, who led an expedition against the Apache in April 1837. The Apache had raided near the municipality of Moctezuma and driven away a herd of cattle. Johnson gathered together 17 North Americans and 5 Mexico muleskinners, apparently collected expense money from the Sonora government, and borrowed an artillery piece, probably a Swivel gun, small enough to be carried mule-back from the presidio at Fronteras. Johnson found an Apache encampment near the southern end of the Animas Mountains in New Mexico. Juan José Compá led the group which, according to Johnson, consisted of 80 men plus women and children. Johnson and his men attacked the Apache, killing 20, including Compá, and wounding another 20. For his accomplishment, Johnson received a reward of 100 pesos and the official thanks of the state government. With the death of Compá, Mangas Coloradas (Red Sleeves) became the most prominent Apache leader.

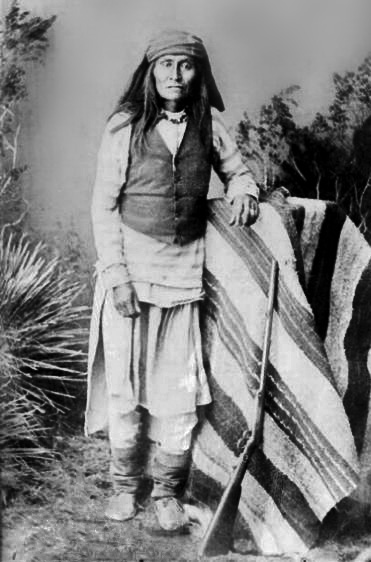
The son of Mangas Coloradas, the most prominent Apache leader of the 1850s. Photo taken in 1884.

Punitive missions such as Johnson's however, inflamed the Apache rather than intimidated them. The rich Santa Rita copper mine in New Mexico was a principal target of Mangas Coloradas and his followers. In 1838, 22 fur trappers were killed nearby and the Apache severed the mine's supply line. The 300 to 400 inhabitants of Santa Rita fled south toward the Janos presidio, 150 miles away, but the Apache killed nearly all of them en route. Afterwards, the Santa Rita mine was only occasionally in operation until 1873 when Apache chief Cochise signed a peace agreement with the US and the mine was reopened.

In 1839 North American James Kirker was contracted by the governor of Chihuahua for 25,000 pesos to raise an army of up to 200 men to suppress the Apache. Kirker's second in command was a Shawnee Indian named Skybuck. The "Sahuanos", or Shawnees, as Kirker's men were called also included Delaware Indians and escaped slaves from the U.S as well as Anglo Americans and Mexicans. Kirker's small army seems to have worsened the situation by killing friendly Apache or groups negotiating peace, after which Apache raids increased. In 1846, Kirker and local Mexicans were responsible for a massacre of 130 peaceful Apaches at Galeana, Chihuahua. Kirker claimed that he had followed the trail of stolen livestock to the Apache encampment.

In 1849, the bounty laws in Chihuahua were formalized and strengthened. Apache adult male prisoners were worth 250 pesos each, females and children 150 pesos. Dead Apache adult males were worth 200 pesos, the scalp to be given to local governments for verification. The state that year paid out 17,896 for scalps and prisoners. The law was quickly abandoned as it was too costly and Apache scalps could not be distinguished from those of other Indians or of Mexicans.

The punitive missions of Johnson, Kirker, and the Mexican army do not appear to have reduced the scope and scale of Apache depredations.

== Casualties ==
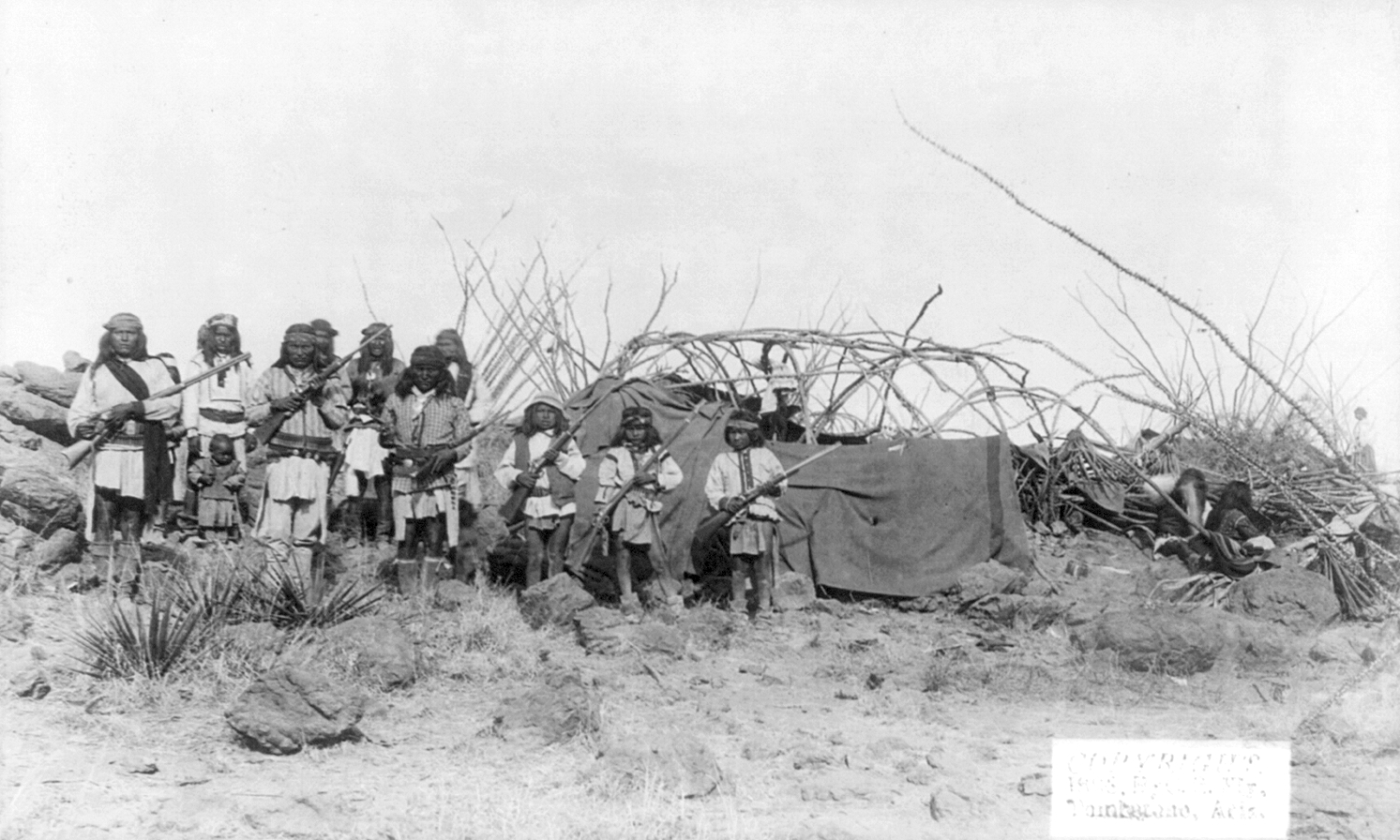
Geronimo's last camp and his warriors at the time of his surrender in 1886 in New Mexico near the Mexican border.

It is impossible to come up with an accurate estimate of casualties for either Mexicans or Apache, but historian William E. Griffen found enough data to illustrate the scope of the war in Chihuahua. From 1832 to 1849, there were 1,707 recorded encounters, 80 percent of which resulted in hostilities, between Indians (Apache and Comanche) and Mexicans. Of these 1,040 were reported to be Apache. The remaining 667 were by Comanche or Indians unidentified by tribe. Data was sufficient to total up casualty figures for nine of the years between 1835 and 1846. A total of 1,394 Mexicans were killed, including 774 killed by Apache and 620 killed by Comanche or unidentified Indians. A total of 559 Indians were reported killed, including 373 Apache and 186 Comanche and unidentified Indians. Casualty figures for both sides included many women and children. Additional incidents and casualties undoubtedly were unrecorded.

Deaths due to the Apache war in Sonora may have been even higher, although data is anecdotal. A Mexican official estimated that 5,000 Sonorans had lost their lives to the Apaches in the 1830s. That seems an exaggeration although, undoubtedly, casualties were substantial. The town of Arizpe saw its population reduced from 7,000 to 1,500 in a few years because it was necessary to move the capital of the state from there because of Apache attacks. Tucson was attacked several times and 200 people were killed by infiltrating Apache inside the walls of the presidio of Fronteras between 1832 and 1849.

What is clear is that Mexico's capacity for defense was seriously weakened by Apache and Comanche raids at the same time as Mexico was suffering from "centralism, clericalism, militarism, and American imperialism."

== Enter the United States ==
The U.S. victory in the Mexican–American War and the annexation of much of northern Mexico in 1848 did not initially impact the ongoing war between Mexico and the Apache as raids into Mexico and in the new territories of the United States continued as usual. Over time, however, the U.S. took the bulk of the responsibility for defeating and pacifying the Apache, most of whom resided in the United States. The employment of friendly Apache as scouts to find and fight hostile Apache was a critical element in the eventual success of the U.S. (see Apache scouts).

The last hostile band of Apache, led by Geronimo, surrendered in 1886, although individual Apaches continued with banditry in the U.S. and Mexico for many additional years (see Apache Wars). Illustrating the tenacity and elusiveness of the Apache, thousands of U.S. and Mexican soldiers and Apache scouts pursued Geronimo for more than one year, mostly in northern Mexico, until he was induced to surrender his band of only 36 men, women, and children.

== See also ==
- Comanche–Mexico Wars
- Comanche Wars
- American Indian Wars
