= Expedition of Sufyan bin Auf =

- Part of the Arab–Byzantine wars
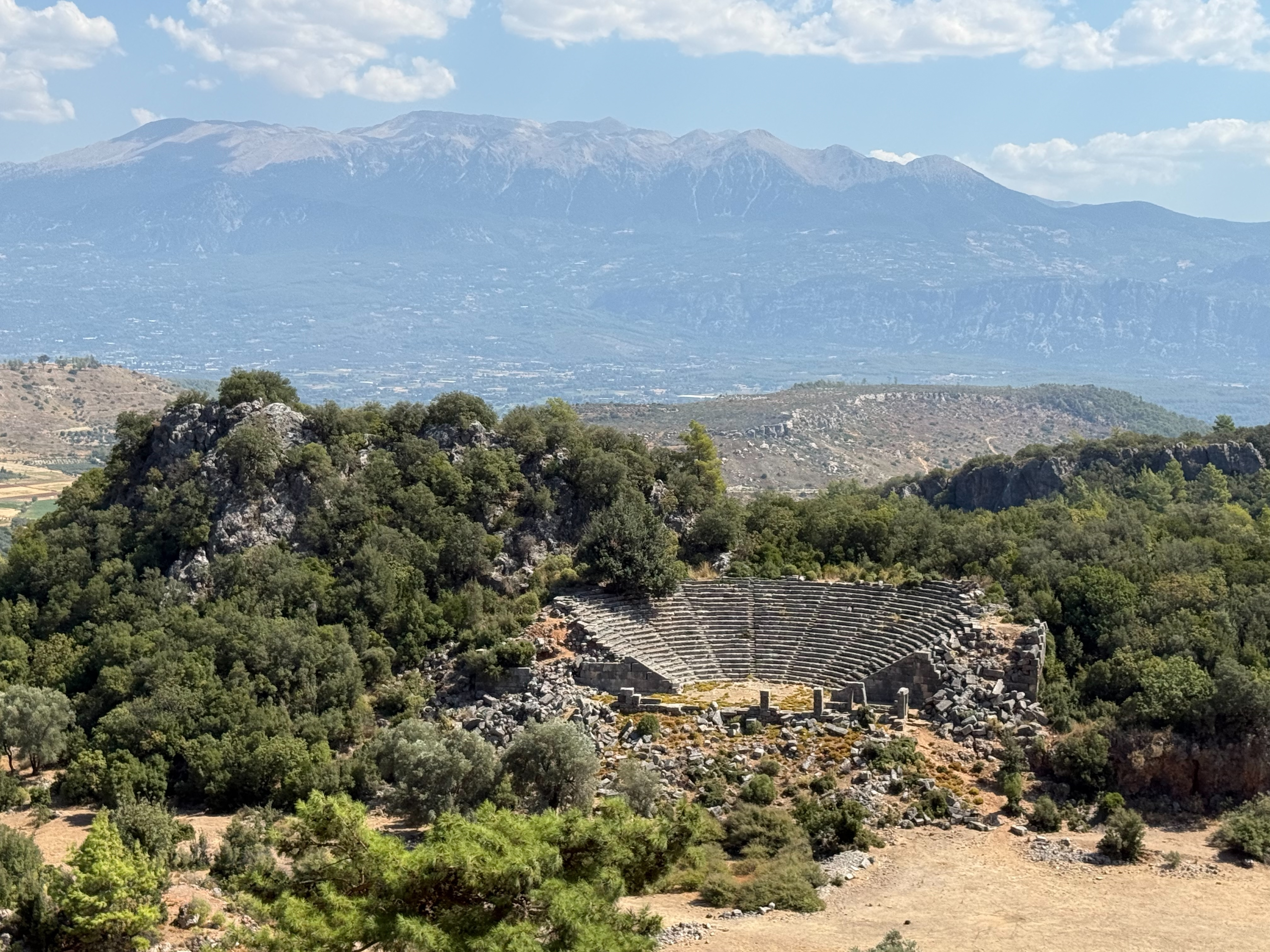
- Modern view of the ruins of Pinara and mountains in Antalya Province, in the region of ancient Lycia
Date	673/4 or 677/678
Location	Inland mountain passes of Asia Minor and off the coast of Lycia
Result	Byzantine victory

Belligerents
Byzantine Empire	Umayyad Caliphate

Commanders and leaders
Florus; Petrona; Cyprianus	Sufyan ibn Awf †

Strength
Unknown	Large naval fleet Land army: 30,000+

Casualties and losses
Light to moderate	30,000 killed on Land; Near-total destruction of the fleet

The Expedition of Sufyan bin Auf (674–678) was a coordinated overland and maritime campaign fought by the Umayyad Caliphate against the Byzantine Empire Initiated by Caliph Mu'awiya I as a grand strategic attempt to capture the Byzantine capital of Constantinople. The multi-year campaign concluded in a catastrophic dual disaster for the Caliphate, where it deemed to be the climatic factor of the broader siege of Constantinople between 674-678, culminating in a Byzantine victory.

== Background ==
The geopolitical catalyst for the expedition began with the abrupt assassination of Byzantine Emperor Constans II in 668, who was murdered in his bath at Syracuse, by a faction of mutinous court officials. His eldest son, Constantine IV, immediately ascended the throne in Constantinople during a period of profound internal instability and institutional fracture. Before the new administration could stabilize the imperial frontiers, Constantine was forced to launch a rapid domestic counter-offensive to suppress a severe military coup spearheaded by the Opsikion Theme. The rebellious provincial troops marched on the capital, demanding that Constantine's younger brothers, Heraclius and Tiberius, be elevated to the status of co-emperors to dilute his centralized authority. Through a combination of diplomatic maneuvering and decisive force, Constantine neutralized the ringleaders, ordered his brothers to be publicly tonsured and confined as monks, and successfully consolidated sole autocratic rule over a deeply fragile empire.

=== Umayyad mobilization and naval expansion ===
Recognizing the internal chaos and political paralysis afflicting the Byzantine leadership, Caliph Mu'awiya I of the Umayyad Caliphate launched a calculated, grand-strategic campaign to Decisively defeat the Byzantine Empire. Having developed considerable maritime infrastructure along the Syrian and Egyptian coastlines over the preceding decades, the Caliphate utilized the transition of power in Constantinople to escalate their maritime incursions into the Aegean Sea. By 670, Umayyad forces had captured the strategic island of Rhodes, establishing a forward naval base that allowed them to project power directly into the Roman heartland. This was rapidly followed by the occupation of the island of Chios and the capture of Smyrna, effectively seizing control of the vital maritime trade routes and naval approaches leading to the Hellespont.

=== Assault on Constantinople (674–678) ===
By 674, the Umayyad strategy culminated in the launching of a massive, multi-year expeditionary operation directed at the Byzantine capital. Rather than attempting a standard, static land investment, the Arab forces executed a sophisticated seasonal blockade strategy. The primary Umayyad armada established a permanent winter base on the nearby Cyzicus peninsula along the southern coast of the Sea of Marmara. From this secure logistical hub, the fleet launched annual naval assaults against the sea walls of Constantinople from spring until autumn, retreating back to Cyzicus each winter to refit and resupply.

Simultaneously, the Byzantine high command found its resources critically overextended. While struggling to defend the capital's massive fortifications, the empire faced a devastating second front in the Balkans, where a coalition of Slavic tribes launched the contemporaneous Siege of Thessalonica, threatening to sever Byzantine control over Greece and Thrace.

=== Logistical collapse and the ordered withdrawal ===
By 677, the tactical deadlock began to shift drastically in favor of the Byzantines. The introduction of Greek fire—a newly invented liquid incendiary weapon projected from pressurized bronze siphons aboard specialized Byzantine dromons—inflicted catastrophic damage on the Umayyad wooden warships, shattering their naval cohesion and breaking the morale of the crews. Constantine IV's naval forces would regain the upper hand in a series of naval engagements against Umayyad admiral Yazid bin Shagara.

Concurrently, the multi-year campaign had severely depleted the Umayyad expeditionary force's provisions, leading to widespread disease, famine, and dwindling livestock within their camps. Realizing that the capital's fortifications were impregnable and that the fleet could no longer sustain its seasonal blockades, the supreme military command in Damascus determined that the entire campaign was an operational failure. Caliph Mu'awiya subsequently issued orders for a total, synchronized strategic withdrawal. The remaining forces were split into two distinct components: a primary naval fleet tasked with sailing back to the Levant, and a massive overland marching column commanded by the veteran general Sufyan ibn Awf, which was ordered to march across the rugged Anatolian plateau back to Syria.

== Expedition of Sufyan ==
The Umayyad expeditionary force was a massive combined-arms operation consisting of a primary naval fleet and a matching land army. According to medieval chroniclers like Theophanes the Confessor, the land forces under Sufyan ibn Awf were not composed entirely of regular Syrian troops. Instead, they were heavily augmented by large numbers of mutawa'a—pious volunteers from across the Caliphate who joined the campaign for religious merit, drawn by the prestige of the assault on the Christian capital. While highly motivated, these volunteer units lacked the rigid tactical training and cohesion of the regular Syrian jund forces.

Byzantine forces under the patrician generals Florus, Petronas, and Cyprianus relied on professional regional garrisons. The Byzantines successfully utilized the rugged terrain of Anatolia to isolate, ambush, and exploit the lack of command structure among the mixed regular and volunteer Arab forces during their retreat

=== Land ambush in the Anatolian passes ===
As the Umayyad land army abandoned its forward positions around the Golden Horn and the Thracian hinterlands, it began a long, grueling march back through the rugged, mountainous interior of Anatolia toward Syria. This massive column, heavily congested with regular Syrian troops and thousands of non-professional mutawa'a volunteers, faced severe operational fatigue, dwindling supplies, and a hostile population. Sensing tactical vulnerability, the Byzantine high command dispatched a highly mobile force led by the patrician generals Florus, Petronas, and Cyprianus. (Note: It is also possible that Sufyan's army was marching through Lycia in order to reinforce the siege of Constantinople rather than retreating at the time it was defeated, as Theophanes provides limited information on the exact circumstances of the Umayyad defeat)

Rather than risking a standard pitched battle on open ground where the Umayyad cavalry could maneuver, the three Byzantine generals utilized their intimate knowledge of local geography to shadow the retreating column. They established a series of heavily fortified blockades and choke points within the narrow mountain passes. When the vanguard of the Arab army entered the defiles, the Byzantines launched a highly synchronized asymmetric assault from the high ground. Cut off from reinforcements and unable to form effective defensive lines due to the restrictive terrain, the Umayyad ranks disintegrated into mass panic. The chronicle of Theophanes the Confessor explicitly records that 30,000 Umayyad soldiers were slaughtered during this running ambush, including their supreme field commander, Sufyan ibn Awf. This catastrophic loss effectively wiped out the Caliphate's primary offensive land army in Asia Minor and permanently compromised their overland transit routes across the Anatolian plateau.

=== Naval engagement off Syllaeum ===
Simultaneously, the fleeing Umayyad fleet evacuated its winter naval base on the Cyzicus peninsula and attempted to navigate southward toward the safety of the Levant. The maritime retreat quickly turned into a running disaster as the Byzantine navy, organized around swift specialized dromons, executed an aggressive pursuit down the Aegean and Mediterranean coastlines. The Byzantines repeatedly harried the larger, lumbering Arab transport ships and war galleys, utilizing pressurized bronze siphons to project Greek fire into the enemy ranks. This highly volatile incendiary weapon caused severe structural damage to the wooden vessels and broke the tactical cohesion of the retreating armada.

The ultimate climax of the maritime theatre unfolded as a major naval engagement directly off the coast of the heavily fortified Byzantine stronghold of Syllaeum in Pamphylia. Already heavily damaged, leaking, and operating with severely depleted crews from the continuous Byzantine naval skirmishes, the remnants of the Umayyad fleet were struck by a sudden and violent Mediterranean tempest. The storm's high winds and treacherous currents trapped the unmaneuverable Arab ships against the rocky, unforgiving Pamphylian cliffs. Lacking the structural integrity to survive the violent surf, the vast majority of the remaining Umayyad vessels were smashed to pieces or foundered in open water. This combination of active naval harassment, Greek fire, and environmental devastation resulted in the near-total destruction of the Umayyad navy, neutralizing Arab maritime power in the eastern Mediterranean for decades. Of the few Umayyad ships which survived the storm, most were hunted down and destroyed by the Byzantines, thus completing the disaster.

== Aftermath ==
The failure of the campaign in 677–678 CE marked the first major check on the westward expansion of the nascent Umayyad Caliphate. Following the catastrophic destruction of the Arab navy by Greek fire and the heavy losses sustained by the land forces due to winter starvation, Caliph Mu'awiya I was forced to sue for peace with Emperor Constantine IV.

=== The Peace Treaty of 678 ===
A formal 30-year peace treaty was ratified between the two empires, requiring the Umayyads to:

- Evacuate all the newly captured islands in the Aegean Sea, including Rhodes.
- Pay an annual tribute to Constantinople consisting of 3,000 gold pieces, 50 slaves, and 50 thoroughbred horses.

=== Geopolitical Impact ===
The Byzantine victory significantly heightened the international prestige of the Empire, prompting the Khagan of the Avars and various Slavic chieftains in the Balkans to send embassies to Constantinople recognizing Byzantine suzerainty. For the Umayyads, the failure exposed the limits of their early naval power and temporarily halted direct assaults on the Byzantine capital until the Second Siege in 717–718.

Period of Stability and reconquest of Cilicia (684–685)

Following the treaty, the Anatolian frontier remained relatively stable for several years. While the Umayyad Caliphate would descend into severe internal chaos following the deaths of Yazid I and Marwan I during the Second Fitna where Constantine decided to abandon the defensive restraint, mobilizing the imperial army and personally conducted a Campaign into Cilicia, advancing his forces as far as the strategic stronghold of Mopsuestia. This operation forced the Umayyad Caliph Abd al-Malik to offer more concessions to the Byzantines in return for peace, with Constantine IV and his successor Justinian II receiving an enormous annual sum of tribute after 685.

== Bibliography ==
- Crawford, Peter (2021). Justinian II: The Roman Emperor Who Lost his Nose and his Throne and Regained Both. Pen & Sword History. ISBN 978 1 52675 531 5.
- Lilie, Ralph-Johannes (1976). Die byzantinische Reaktion auf die Ausbreitung der Araber. Studien zur Strukturwandlung des byzantinischen Staates im 7. und 8. Jhd [The Byzantine Response to the Spread of the Arabs. Studies on the structural change of the Byzantine state in the 7th and 8th centuries] (in German). Munich: Institut für Byzantinistik und Neugriechische Philologie der Universität München. OCLC 797598069.
- Turtledove, Harry (1982). 'The Chronicle of Theophanes' An English translation of anni mundi 6095-6305 (a.p. 602-813), with introduction and notes. Philadelphia: University of Pennsylvania Press. ISBN 0-8122-7842-9.
- Treadgold, Warren (1997). A History of the Byzantine State and Society. Stanford, California: Stanford University Press. ISBN 978-0804779371.
- Bury, John Bagnell (1889). A History of the Later Roman Empire from Arcadius to Irene (395 A.D. to 800 A.D.). Macmillan Publishers.
- Jankowiak, Marek (2013). "The First Arab Siege of Constantinople". In Zuckerman, Constantin (ed.). Travaux et mémoires, Vol. 17: Constructing the Seventh Century. Paris: Association des Amis du Centre d’Histoire et Civilisation de Byzance. pp. 237–320.
- Mango, Cyril; Scott, Roger (1997). The Chronicle of Theophanes Confessor. Byzantine and Near Eastern History, AD 284–813. Oxford: Oxford University Press. ISBN 0-19-822568-7.
