= List of medieval weapons =

This list includes medieval weapons from Europe and the Middle East. Roughly categorized by type of weapon and period of use.

Summary comparison of medieval weapons
Name	Example	Period (millenium/century)	Description
Blade weapons
Bastardsword also hand and a half sword		second half of the 13th century to 17th century	The Bastardsword was balanced in such a way that it could be wielded with either one or two hands, making it an intermediate form between the long sword and the knightly sword. Typically, the blade length ranges from 41 inches (1.0 m) to 47 inches (1.2 m), with a weight of 3 ounces (0.085 kg) to 4.1 ounces (0.12 kg).
Longsword		Mid 13th century to 15th century	The Longsword first appeared around 1250. Early long swords resembled one-handed swords, featuring relatively broad blades that were either parallel-sided or slightly tapered. Later long swords (after 1350) had blades that tapered to a sharp point along their full length, with diamond-shaped cross-sections. This made them strong and rigid thrusting weapons that were effective against plate armour. By the early 14th century, the longsword had evolved into a cutting and thrusting weapon with a sharp point for thrusting and a wide, flat middle section for cutting. The typical longsword had a length of about 48 inches (120 cm) from pummel to tip and had a weight of 2.5 pounds (1.1 kg) to 4 pounds (1.8 kg)
Knightly sword			The single handed knightly sword first appeared in the 5h century. These early knightly swords featured a transverse, toggle-shaped pommel, a short wooden grip, and a short, straight crossguard. They had rounded tips and were used for slashing rather than thrusting. By the 12th century, pointed blades had been developed that could also be used for thrusting. The knight’s sword had a blade length ranging from 31 inches (79 cm) to a maximum of 33.4 inches (85 cm).
Saif			The saif the islamic sword was similar to european swords with a straight double-edged blade and a straight hilt. It is impossible to say with certainty when exactly the curved hilt and the curved blade were introduced. While the traditional view dates the curved blade to the 14th century, there are too many exceptions to support this theory.
Dagger		5th millenium B.C. until today	The dagger probably originated as early as the Neolithic period through the use of hand-held spearheads. Contemporary European terms for this weapon were coustel or cultellus, and until the 13th century it was used only by ordinary foot soldiers. From the 12th century onwards, the term dagger became established, deriving from the Vulgar Latin word dagua. Six types of dagger can be identified on the basis of their hilts: the quillon dagger, the rondel dagger, the kidney dagger, the ear-pommel dagger, transitional types and the cinquedea. The blades range in length from 8 inches (20 cm) to 19 inches (48 cm).
Sax			Sax or seax, (Old English: seax knife), seems to have first appeard in the 5th century. Although most closely associated with the Anglo-Saxons, the sax was also carried by the Vikings. The sax had a single-edged blade ranging in length from 4.7 inches (12 cm) to 39.3 inches (100 cm). The back was either straight or slightly curved. Beginning in the 9th and 10th centuries, a wider sax developed, whose flat, straight back sloped downward toward the tip at a blunt angle. The sax often featured copper or silver inlaid decoration or rune inscriptions.
Polearms
Fauchard		12th century to 17th century	The fauchard introduced in the 12th century developed from the scythe for war. It was a large razor blade fixed to the end of a staff.
Lance		Antiquity to early 20th century	Presumably adopted from the Romans, the lance first appeared among the Franks in the 6th century. This lance was made of strong, hard wood, was about 13 feet (4.0 m) long, and had a blade-shaped metal head with two cutting edges and a sharp point. A wing-like attachment behind the spearhead prevented it from penetrating too deeply into the body or armor, making it easier to pull the weapon out. A flared support at the end prevented the spear from being pushed backward under the fighter’s arm. Until the 13th century the lance remained this form. In the early 13th century the flaired restraint was replaced by a metal ring called grate or graper. At the end of the century the lance for tournaments had a blunt tip that later developed into special crown-shaped head the Coronel to prevent injuries. The head of the lance for actual battle varied from leaf shape forms, polygonal tip, pointed tip and, pyramid-shaped tip. At the end of the century a funnel shaped metal plate the vamplate for hand protection as slipped over the shaft.
Bill		13th century to 17th century	The bill, derived from the agricultural tool the billhook, was a staff weapon. Although its head varied in size, it was usually fitted with a sturdy hook whose inside and outside curves formed cutting edges. The bill is documented from the 13th to 17th centuries and was used by combatants on foot. The earliest forms featured a slightly convex cutting edge topped by a spike, and a compact blade. Over time, the head became longer, the centre of the edge sharper, and the fluke more pronounced. Sometimes, the faces had faceting or fullers. Two sharp lugs served as a guard at the base of the head. The socket, which was often inlaid with brass fittings, was mainly truncated pyramidal in shape with a rectangular base and rounded corners. The langets, essential for a combat weapon, formed extensions of the socket.
Halberd		late 13th century to 19th century	The halberd first appeared during the late 13 century in Switzerland. The early halberds had a wide cleaving blade fixed on a roughly 6.5 feet (2.0 m) pole and a long spike at the top. The halberd remained unchanged until the end of the 15th century when the spike became thinner and a fluke to break open helmets or armor was added.
Pollaxe		14th century to 16th century	The poleaxe had been introduced in the 14th century developing from the ordinary axe. Measuring around 5 feet (1.5 m) in length, it had a head consisting of a small convex axe blade, a hammer-like spike at the rear, and a short spike at the top. The upper part of the shaft was reinforced with metal strips, while the lower part featured a rondel.
Battle axe		late 5th millenium B.C.	The battle axe was widespread in pre-classical times, but was regarded as a barbarian weapon in the Greek and Roman worlds. Beginning in the 7th and 8th centuries, two forms began to emerge.In Central Europe, it retained a shape similar to that of the Francisca, with a long, narrow blade that was slightly curved on the outside and deeply hollowed on the inside. In Northern Europe, an axe with a broad, sickle-shaped blade and a flat back developed. Around the year 1000, a second type of Northern European axe appeared: the broadaxe. The cutting edge of the broad axe was often made of specially hardened iron that was welded to the head, and the blade and neck were occasionally decorated with silver or gold inlays. Over time, modifications and special forms emerged featuring spikes, hammers, or points on the side opposite the axe blade. With the advent of polearms in the 14th century, the battle axe’s popularity diminished.
Blunt weapons
War hammer also Raven's Beak		11th century to 17th century	The war hammer evolved in the 11th and 12th centuries from simple tools such as the pick and the mallet. It consisted of a hammer head (used to damage armor plates and joints), balanced on the opposite side by a spike, a blade, or a pick. Some variants also featured a spike at the top of the shaft. In the 14th century, the war hammer was typically wielded with one hand and had a shaft proportion similar to that of a mace. In the 15th century, the head was also mounted on long poles, giving rise to pole-mounted variants such as the Lucerne hammer.
Mace		11th century to early 20th century	The mace first appeard in the 11th century and became along with the lance and sword, a secondary weapon for close combat. Early maces had a wooden shaft, with only the head made of iron or copper alloys. Starting in the 12th century, maces were increasingly made entirely of iron, which allowed them to inflict significantly greater damage, particularly against heavily armored opponents. Two main forms became established: a presumably older form with a knob-like head, and a variant with several flanges or wings arranged evenly around a tubular center and sharp enough to severely damage plate armor.
Flail		11th century to 14th century	The one handed war flail probably orginating from the Khazars was introduced during the 10th century in Eastern europe and the Islamic world. European flails usually consisted of a chain attached to a wooden shaft, with a smooth or spiked metal ball at the end. Some variations featured several balls strung one after another on a single chain or attached to multiple chains. The balls were typically made of iron, brass, bronze, or lead-filled iron. In Eastern Europe and the Islamic world, leather or hemp straps were usually used as connective elements, while organic materials such as bone, antler, or horn were used in addition to metal balls.
ranged weapons
Self bow		throughout the whole Middle Ages	Medieval self- or stave bows were made from ash, yew, hazel, elm, and holly wood. Stave bows varied in length from 5 feet (1.5 m) to 6.3 feet (1.9 m) and had a thick D-shaped cross-section. The back of the bow (the side facing the target) was flat, while the belly was rounded. The bow shaft tapered gradually toward both ends and was usually fitted with horn nocks. A yarn winding was often applied in the middle. The bowstring was made of flax or linen and coated with beeswax. Depending on the bow’s length, the maximum range was between 100 yards (91 m) and 400 yards (370 m). The draw weight also varied from 90 pounds (41 kg) to 140 pounds (64 kg).
Composite bow			The composite bow was constructed of several layers of wood, sinew, horn and bone. There were several different variants in slightly varying forms. Although mostly associated with the Islamic world and Eastern Europe, the composite bow was also used in Western Europe. A composite bow usually consisted of a stave made in three parts: a centre part and two wings. A shape was formed over these pieces of wood. Horn was glued to one side and sinew to the other. The entire stave was then bent backwards. On the inside, the horn pushed and on the outside, the sinew pulled. Composite bows had a length between 2.4 feet (73 cm) to 5 feet (150 cm). Composite bows often featured a "Mongol" thumb-draw and they had an effective range of some 191 yards (175 m)
crossbow		4th century A.D. to mid 16th century	The crossbow likely originated from the ancient Greek gastraphetes. The oldest depictions date from the late Roman period, presumably from the 4th or 5th century. Initially used only rarely by the Franks, it grew increasingly popular beginning in the 11th century. It consisted of a short, heavy bow attached to a wooden shaft. On the top was a groove for the bolt. The trigger mechanism usually consisted of a rotating disc made of hard material, known as the nut. When drawn, the nut held the string in place; pulling the trigger a lever on the underside released the string. Beginning in the 13th century, wooden crossbows were gradually replaced by stronger composite crossbows. These often featured a stirrup at the front of the stock, into which the archer placed a foot when drawing the string, or were drawn using a winch. Starting in the late 15th century, the nut and trigger were sometimes separated by an internal iron-alloy tumbler to reduce trigger resistance. This had to be adjusted before each shot using a cord running along the stock. To prevent accidental firing, crossbows from this period onward were equipped with trigger safety mechanisms.
Sling			Originally a weapon used by peasants, the sling was typically made of leather or fabric and consisted of a small pouch with a thong on either side. After placing a projectile either a rounded pebble or, in later times, a lead shot in the pouch, the sling was whirled around in one hand. Upon gathering sufficient momentum, one string was released, expelling the shot. A variant the fustibalus or fustibal consisting of a sling attached to the end of a rod about 39 inches (99 cm) length had a effective range of more than 180 yards (160 m)
Siege weapons
Mangonel		3rd century B.C. to 15th century	Presumably invented by the Chinese, the mangonel reached Central Europe via Byzantium, Islamic Spain, or the Asian Avars during the 9th and 10th centuries. Early variants consisted of a long, tapered sling arm mounted on a wooden tower and a base. At the longer, thinner end of the sling arm was the sling into which projectiles (generally stones) were placed. At the opposite, thicker, and shorter end of the throwing arm, several ropes up to 125 in number were attached, which were pulled by several people (20 to 250). This generated a force strong enough to hurl a 132.2 pounds (60.0 kg) stone between 87.4 yards (79.9 m) and 164 yards (150 m). Later mangonels featured a double throwing arm, which increased both the load capacity and the projectile weight.
Trebuchet		late 12th century to 15th century	The counterweight trebuchet was invented in the eastern Mediterranean region or Middle East, during or before the first half of the 12th century. The term trebuchet probably derived from the Old French trebuchier (to overthrow, topple). The trebuchet consisted of a sturdy wooden frame (bigua), on which a throwing arm (brachia) several meters long was mounted on a central axis (virga). At the long end of this lever was the projectile holder, a leather trough (coria). At the short end of the arm was the massive counterweight, made, depending on the region and available materials, of cast lead plates, stones, or iron. In addition to the rigidly mounted counterweight, there were also variants such as the so-called biffa, in which the weight was suspended so that it could rotate on a second axle. By the mid 13th century it had reached Western Europe. According to contemporary reports trebuchets could weigh up to 26 tonnes with a with a beam-sling of 13.1 yards (12.0 m). Typical trebuchets generally had counterweights ranging from 4.5 tonnes (4.4 LT) to 13.6 tonnes (13.4 LT) and fired projectiles weighing 99.2 pounds (45.0 kg) to 198.4 pounds (90.0 kg) with a range of up to 300 yards (270 m).
Espringal		mid 13th century to mid 15th century	The Espringa probably developed from the medieval Islamic qaws al-ziyar or skein bow. The exact date on which it first appeared is not known. The earliest mentions can be traced back to the mid-13th century. The Espringa featured a rigid, enclosed rectangular wooden box structure resting directly on a heavy base platform or wooden legs on which sometimes wheels were attached. It was powered by the torsion energy by mean of ropes which were in bundles or fasces. The stored energy of an ordinary Espringa was around 1,800 kilograms (1.8 LT) requiring two men for spanning it with a screw or winch mechanism. The Espringa fired 27.5 inches (70 cm) to 31.4 inches (80 cm) long and some 49.3 ounces (1.40 kg) bolts at a range of 196.8 yards (180.0 m).
Siege tower		3rd millenium B.C. to 15th century A.D.	Siege towers were used to overcome walls, enemy castles or towns and to provide covering fire from an elevated position. They were either moved by men or draft animals. Siege towers featured boarding bridges, throwing machines or great crossbows. Sometimes they were even construced with battering rams. Medieval siege towers had an average height between 27 yards (25 m) to 32 yards (29 m) with three to five stories. Fire and flying rocks, from throwing machines or later solid shot from cannons were the greatest danger for siege towers. To prevent the towers from taking fire or being destroyed by flying rocks or cannon shot they were covered with boards, metal sheds and hides covered in vinegar. Until the 14th century, the main use of siege towers was to assault walls from a boarding bridge alongside a battering ram. Later on, they were used more frequently for undermining purposes and as bridgeheads for shooting. Siege towers were very expensive it took several days to several months to build them and required large amounts of wood and labor.
Battering ram		3rd millenium B.C. to 15 century	The battering ram most likely first appeared in the 3rd millennium B.C. The earliest medieval references date from the 5th and 6th centuries A.D. The battering ram was usually fitted with an iron head and was attached to a wooden frame by mean of ropes. Battering rams normally were covered by a wooden roof dubbed cat, weasel or sow. (Note: According to Kelly DeVries, the term testudo was not among them.) Unlike ordinary battering rams, which were used to breach the base or middle section of a wall, the destruction of parapets required a battering ram suspended from a scaffold made of ladders. This scaffold consisted of two very sturdy ladders set up at an angle to each other and spanned at the top by planking, resembling a house of cards. In addition to the construction with inclined ladders, there was also a variant with ladders running parallel to each other and to the fortress wall. Both methods were broadly similar, although in the latter case, two battering rams were suspended from vertical posts on either side.
Terebra, drill, borer			According to Vitruvius, the siege drill (Greek: trypanon; Latin: terebra) was invented by Diades, an engineer in the service of Alexander the Great. Diades’s drill consisted of a long bed with a groove in which a pointed wooden log, approximately 27 yards (25 m) long and fitted with an iron head, rested on numerous rollers. The rollers reduced friction and allowed the log to move more quickly. Next to the groove were two winches used to set the log in motion. Similar to the battering ram, the entire structure was housed under a roof of arched wooden beams, which was covered with raw animal hides on top to protect it from fire. Another type of drill described by Apollodorus and Anonymus Byzantine consisted of a 1.6 inches (0.041 m) long, finger-thick iron rod, at the end of which was forged an iron plate measuring approximately 51 square inches (330 cm^{2}), tapering toward the tip. This drill was inserted into a wooden cylinder that was set in motion using a rope or a crossbar (as with a winch). The cylinder widened at the end into a head that rotated in a special socket.
gunpowder artillery
Bombard		14th century to 16th century	The bombard first appeared in the 14th century and were usually made from wrought iron. There were also bombards made from bronze or cast iron. Bombards were heavy and cumbersome to transport. To prevent the risk of the barrel from bursting, bombards could fire only a few shots per day. The cannons weighed up to 16 long tons (16 t) and could fire projectiles weighing up to 1,500 pounds (680 kg) a distance of up to 1.9 miles (3.1 km)
Culverin			First mention of the culverin can be traced back to the early 12 century when the Moors according to Conde in 1132 made a culverine of four pounds named Salamonica. It is, however, doubtful whether it was actually a firearm. A culverin were divided into whole culverin and demi-culverin, which fired stone balls of 181 pounds (82 kg) and 91 pounds (41 kg) weight respectively. A typical culverin had a maximum range of 2,500 yards (2,300 m).
Falconet			The Falcon was a light cannon that fired projectiles weighing 1 pound (0.45 kg) to 6 pounds (2.7 kg) It had an approximate caliber of 2.5 inches (6.4 cm) to 3 inches (7.6 cm) and weighed up to 1,100 pounds (500 kg). The falconet was a smaller version of the Falcon and fired lead balls weighing 1 pound (0.45 kg) to 3 pounds (1.4 kg). A 16th-century falconet had a caliber of 2 inches (5.1 cm) to 2.5 inches (6.4 cm) and weighed 350 pounds (160 kg) to 510 pounds (230 kg).
Ribauldequin			The Ribauldequin first appeared in the early 14th century. It consisted of a simple gun carriage with several small cannons arranged side by side, which could be fired almost simultaneously. The largest ribauldequin ever built dates from 1387 and consisted of 144 barrels.
Various
cranequin		mid 14th century	Introduced in the second half of the 14th century the cranequin or rack was a spanning mechanism for the crossbow. The cranequin consisted of a geared winding block with a handle that travelled along a toothed ratchet bar. At one end of the ratchet bar was a claw to engage the string, and a thick cord bridle was attached to the winding block. The bridle was slipped over the end of the tiller and was held in place by pins on either side. As the mechanism was wound, the ratchet bar moved to retract the string. Despite the energy savings, the cranequin was relatively slow to use and cumbersome to transport.
Gaffle			The gaffle also known as goat's foot lever-derived its name from the curve of the lever arms that resembled the hind legs of a goat. The gaffle was introduced around the mid 14th century. Early types were made of wood, later variants were made of metal. Despite their effectiveness, gaffles were used less on the battlefield and mainly during sieges. The could be used both on foot or mounted. Modern experiments showed that it was possible to shoot five bolts a minute using this device on a crossbow of 300 pounds (140 kg) draw-weight.
Windlass			The early windlass, a simple capstan without pulleys, first appeared during the 13th century. It consisted of a box-like metal cap fitted to the end of the tiller. Attached to this cap was a frame housing the capstan and winding handles. Cords extended to the hooking tackle. When in use, the operator would steady the bow on the ground using the stirrup and then wind the handles. With the bow spanned, the winding was turned in the opposite direction to release the hooks. After the development of steel bows, the windlass received additional pulleys. To enable the operator to wind the crossbow at an ergonomic height, windlass crossbows had longer tillers. Due to their size the windlass was rather used in sieges than at pitched battles.
Crossbow bolt			Crossbow bolts were usually made of oak, beech, maple, or birch. Unlike arrows, crossbow bolts had only two fletchings. This allowed the bolt to rest flat on the tiller. The bolts ranged in length from 13 inches (33 cm) to 17.5 inches (44 cm) and in weight from 2.1 ounces (60 g) to 6.2 ounces (180 g).
Incendiary Arrowhead			Incendiary arrows were used in the Middle Ages, primarily during raids (chevauchée), sieges and naval battles. There were various designs for incendiary arrowheads; the most common were the cage type and the bag type. Cage-type arrows tended to go out whilst in flight. The bag-type offered an improved solution, but required a particularly long bodkin tip to prevent the arrow shaft from burning. With the cage-type, a wick made of wool, hemp or tow, soaked in a flammable substance, was stuffed into the cage. The wick could either be prepared in advance or dipped on the spot. The bag-type had to be prepared before the battle. An extra-long bodkin arrowhead was pushed through a canvas sausage filled with a combustible paste. The bag was then sealed with combustible resin.
Bodkin			Specially designed to penetrate both mail and plate armor, these tips had square, triangular, or diamond-shaped cross-sections. The size ranged from 2 inches (5.1 cm) to about 5 inches (13 cm), and a weight from 0.5 ounces (14 g) to 1.75 ounces (50 g).
Greek fire		7th century to mid 15th century	Greek fire, also known as liquid fire, naval fire, living fire, or Romei fire, probably dates back to the 7th-century Greek architect and inventor Callinicus of Heliopolis. In the first half of the 9th century, Greek fire was adopted by the Muslims and reached Western Europe after the First Crusade in the early 12th century. The composition of Greek fire remains a matter of debate to this day, with two main variants. The base of the first mixture was petroleum, to which sulfur, resin, and other components (possibly quicklime as a thickening agent) were added. The basis of the second variant was saltpeter, to which sulfur, resin, and oil were added. Greek fire was propelled by an ordinary pump and was either ignited upon ejection, ignited spontaneously upon contact with water (due to a violent reaction between quicklime and water), or heated in a sealed copper vessel, escaped under pressure, and was ignited outside by a torch.
Shields
Round shield		5 century to mid 12th century	The round shield was construced from wood (mostly lime, willow or poplar). They could be covered, perhaps on both sides by leather. A central hole was fitted with a riveted iron hand-grip, covered on the outside by a metal boss (umbo) to protect the hand. There could be a metal rim and metal strips for extra reinforcement. The shields had a dieameter between 20.5 inches (52 cm) and 31.5 inches (80 cm) and were between 0.6 inches (15 mm)–1.2 inches (30 mm) thick.
Kite shield also Norman shield		mid 12th century to second half of 13th century	By the mid 12th century the round shield was gradually replaced by the kite shield. The shield had a elongate triangle or kite shaped form with the top and sides slightly curved. They were probably made of wood, which was likely covered with leather, and featured a metal boss and possibly a metal rim. In addition, the field could be reinforced with cross-shaped metal fittings or decorated with painting.The shields were held in place by various leather straps that were riveted to the inside. There could be a further loop strap at the top by which the shield could be suspended from the neck during fighting, thus giving greater protection and allowing more freedom of movement.
Heater shield			Around 1270 the kite shield were replaced by the heater shield. They were moderate in size, slightly curved to fit the body, and typically constructed from wood with applied layers of canvas and leather. The field were decorated with heraldic devices not only for symbolic functions but also to be recognized during battle.
Pavise		14th century to 16th century	In order to protect archers and crossbowmen, the pavise a large, oblong shield was introduced in the 14th century. The shield usually featured a central groove on the inside in which a stake was inserted to act as a prop. On the outside, this groove was usually reinforced by a raised panel that ran the entire length of the shield. The shield had a rounded top and, frequently, a round bottom too. It had straight sides that widened slightly towards the base. The groove in the centre could be straight or widen towards the bottom. On the inside, the full shield curved inwards, and two straps or chains were attached, enabling the soldier to carry it on his back. The shield was typically made of wood covered with cloth, parchment or cuir bouilli, though some were reinforced with iron bands. The pavise was also used for assault defence, in which case special spikes were fitted along the bottom edge to fix the shield to the ground as the attacking force advanced. There was also a metal observation grille at the top. The front of the pavise was typically decorated with a variety of designs, including coats of arms.
Buckler		8th century to 17th century	The buckler first appeared among the Byzantines as early as the 8th century, suggesting an Eastern origin. Beginning in the early 13th century, the buckler first appeared in Western Europe and, starting in the 14th century, also in Central Europe. The buckler consisted of a sturdy iron plate (round, square, or occasionally trapezoidal) fitted with a hand strap on the inside. The rim was reinforced with a metal strip riveted all the way around. Sometimes a hook or spike projected from the center to break or block an opponent’s blade. Some bucklers had a long steel spike attached to a hinge that could be folded down when not in use. Others featured a small hook in the upper part of the buckler that was used to hang a lantern to light the wearer’s path at night. Some bucklers from the mid-16th century were combined with a wheel-lock or matchlock pistol.
Adarga			The adarga, which derives its name from the Arabic 'el-daraqa' or 'daraq', was originally round or oval in shape. It then became heart-shaped, and finally, from the end of the 14th century, it took the form of two ellipses with the longer sides overlapping. It measured about 27 inches (69 cm)–32 inches (81 cm) in the long axis. Two layers of leather were glued and sewn together to make the adarga rigid yet elastic, which added to its protective ability. Adarga were often adorned with incised and gilt ornaments, sometimes with Moorish inscriptions, as well as metal appliqués and borders. Inside, in the centre, there were two rigid leather handles and a small cushion beneath them. Both handles were usually held in one hand to enable the shield to be moved freely in any direction to parry the enemy’s weapon. During the 14th and 15th century, the adarga was adopted by spanish armies. Adarga shields remained in use until the 16th century, but the development of firearms led to their disappearance.
Mantelet			A mobile shield similar to a pavise. The consisted of wattle, planks or poles joinded by cross-members.

== Bibliography ==
- Ashdown, Charles Henry (1988). An illustrated History of Arms & Armour. Hertfordshire: Wordsworth Editions. ISBN 1-85326-914-X.
- Boeheim, Wendelin (1890). Handbuch der Waffenkunde: das Waffenwesen in seiner historischen Entwickelung vom Beginn des Mittelalters bis zum Ende des 18. Jahrhunderts. Leipzig: E.A. Seemann.
- Bradbury, Jim (1985). The Medieval Archer. Woodbridge: Boydell Press. ISBN 0-85115-194-9.
- Breiding, Dirk H. (2013). A Deadly Art: European Crossbows, 1250 – 1850. New Haven: Yale University Press. ISBN 978-0-300-19704-4.
- Cameron Stone, George (1961). A Glossary of the Construction, Decoration and Use of Arms and Armor in All Countries and All Times Together with Some closely Related Subjects. New York: Jack Brussel.
- D´Amato, Raffaele; Pollington, Stephen (2023). Anglo-Saxon Kings and Warlords AD 400 – 1070. Oxford: Osprey. ISBN 978-1-4728-5535-0.
- Davies, Jonathan (2019). The Medieval Cannon 1326–1494. Oxford: Osprey Publishing. ISBN 978-1-4728-3721-9.
- DeVries, Kelly; Douglas Smith, Robert (2012). Medieval Military Technology. Toronto: University of Toronto Press. ISBN 978-1-4426-0497-1.
- DeVries, Kelly (1992). Medieval Military Technology. Peterborough, Ont.: Broadview Press.
- Edge, David (1996). Arms and Armour of the Medieval Knight: an illustrated History of Weaponry in the Middle Ages. London: Saturn Books. ISBN 1-86222-001-8.
- Fields, Nic (2006). The Hun Scourge of God - AD 375-5650. Oxford: Osprey Publishing. ISBN 1-84603-025-0.
- Gravett, Christopher (2002). Medieval Siege Warfare. Oxford: Osprey Publishing. ISBN 1-84176-531-7.
- Grand, Neil (2020). The Medieval Longsword. Oxford: Osprey Publishing. ISBN 978-1-4728-0600-0.
- Hardy, Robert (1993). Longbow: A Social and Military History. Lyons and Burford.
- Holdsworth, Alistair F. (March 2024). "Fantastic Flails and Where to Find Them: The Body of Evidence for the Existence of Flails in the Early and High Medieval Eras in Western, Central, and Southern Europe". Histories. 4 (1).
- Karasulas, Antony (2004). Mounted Archers of the Steppe 600 BC-AD 1300. Oxford: Osprey Publishing. ISBN 1-84176-809-X.
- Laking, Francis Guy (1920c). A Record of European Armour and Arms through Seven Centuries. Vol. III. London: Bell and Sons.
- Lepage, Jean Denis (2005). Medieval Armies and Weapons in Western Europe. Jefferson: McFarland. ISBN 0-7864-1772-2.
- Loades, Mike (2013). The Longbow. Oxford: Osprey Publishing. ISBN 978-1-78200-085-3.
- Loades, Mike (2018). The Crossbow. Oxford: Osprey Publishing. ISBN 978-1-4728-2460-8.
- Loades, Mike (2016). The Composite Bow. Oxford: Osprey Publishing. ISBN 978-1-4728-0591-1.
- Nicolle, David (2003). Medieval Siege Weapons (1) Byzantium The Islamic World India AS 476-1526. Oxford: Osprey Publishing. ISBN 1-84176-459-0.
- Nicolle, David (2002b). Medieval Siege Weapons (2) Western Europe AD 585-1385. Oxford: Osprey Publishing. ISBN 1-84176-235-0.
- Nicolle, David; et al. (Islamic Arms And Armour) (1979). Robert Elgood (ed.). An introduction to arms and warfare in classical Islam. London: Scolar Press.
- Nicolle, David (2002c). Medieval Warfare Source Book: Warfare in Western Christendom. London: Brockhampton. ISBN 1-86019-889-9.
- Norris, John (2003). Early Gunpowder Artillery, c.1300-1600. Ramsbury: Crowood Press. ISBN 1-8612-6615-4.
- Nossov, Konstantin (2005). Ancient and Medieval Siege Weapons: A fully illustrated Guide to Siege Weapons and Tactics. Guilford, Conn.: Lyons Press. ISBN 1-5922-8710-7.
- Oakeshott, R. Ewart (1964). The Sword on the Age of Chivalry. New York: Praeger.
- Philp, Brian (1973). Excavations In West Kent 1960-1970: The Discovery and Excavation of Prehistoric, Roman, Saxon and Medieval Sites mainly in the Bromley area and in the Darent Valley. West Kent Border Archeological Group.
- Roth, Erik (2017). With a Bended Bow: Archery in Medieval and Renaissance Europe. Stroud: Spellmount. ISBN 978-0-7509-8374-7.
- Sprague, Martina (2009). A History of Edged Weapon Warfare. Yardley: Westholme Publishing. ISBN 978-1-59416-101-8.
- Tarassuk, Leonid; Blair, Claude (1982). The Complete Encyclopedia of Arms & Weapons. New York: Simon & Schuster.
- Williams, Gareth (2014). "From Cut to Thrust: The Hand-and-a-half Sword". Medieval Warfare. IV (6). JSTOR 48578395.
- Wise, Terence (1976). Medieval Warfare. New York: Hastings House.
