= Avaria =

Avaria may refer to:

- Avar Khanate of the Caucasian Avars in the Caucasus
- Avar Khaganate of the medieval Pannonian Avars in the Pannonian Basin
- Avar March
- Avaria (moth), a genus of moths

== See also ==
- Avar (disambiguation)
