= Avari =

Avari may refer to:

- Avari (Middle-earth), a group of elves in J. R. R. Tolkien's fantasy writings
- Avars (Pannonia), a group of people in pre-medieval Europe.
- Avari Hotels, a Pakistani chain of Hotels affiliated with the Avari Group.
- Erick Avari (born 1952), Indian-American television, film and theater actor.

== See also ==
- Avar (disambiguation)
