= First Battle of Terrenate =

Spanish-era battle in Southern Arizona

Coordinates: 31°45′03″N 110°12′07″W

- Part of the Apache-Mexico Wars
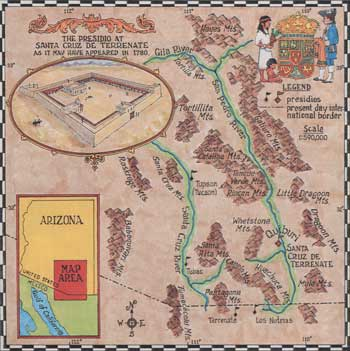
- Fort Santa Cruz de Terrenate in southern Arizona.
Date	July 7, 1776
Location	near Fort Terrenate
Result	Spanish victory

Belligerents
Spain	Apache

Commanders and leaders
(Spain) Francisco Tovar †	Unknown

Strength
~56	Unknown

Casualties and losses
30 killed	Unknown

The First Battle of Terrenate on July 7, 1776 was a military engagement during the Spanish period of Arizona. It was fought between Spanish soldiers and Apache warriors, near the Presidio Santa Cruz de Terrenate in the present day southern Arizona.

== Background ==
The site for El Presidio Santa Cruz de Terrenate, near the middle of the San Pedro River, was chosen on August 22, 1775 by Colonel Hugo O'Conor (born in Ireland) who was in charge of relocating Spanish fortifications on the Sonoran frontier. The spot was on a bluff overlooking the San Pedro River, which provided natural fortifications on three sides.

The walls were built in the shape of a large square, with one triangular bastion at a corner to protect the presidio's two front walls and a main gate protected by a two-story guardhouse. Several adobe-walled structures and jacals were also constructed to house the families of the garrison soldiers, along with a small barracks, an officer's quarters, a chapel and a plaza. The area had pasturage, wood and water.

The garrison consisted of the commander, Captain Francisco Tovar and fifty-six soldados de cuera ("leather jackets"). Artillery had not yet arrived at the isolated post, which was still under construction at the time of battle. The fighting men were armed with pistols, muskets, bows, swords, adargas (leather shields), and lances.

== Battle ==
The Spaniards did not have long to wait before hostile Apaches began to harass the settlement, attacking anyone who ventured out for water or those who tried to plant crops in the nearby fields. Apaches were attracted by the large number of horses kept at the settlement and they ran off the herds whenever they were unguarded. The Apache also burned the fields of crops and the jackals.

Although not the first Apache-Spanish battle involving the Santa Cruz de Terreante soldiers, the battle on July 7, 1776 was said to have occurred at the fort, but it did not, according to archaeologists Deni Seymour and Mark Harlan who have reviewed the documentary evidence.(see http://www.seymourharlan.com/My_Homepage_Files/Page93.html) The battle took place along the San Pedro River, at some distance from the uncompleted fort, and it left the commander and 29 of his men dead after a long fight. According to this new information, the Spaniards saw the Apache fording the San Pedro a day and a half from the presidio, and although unprepared, they pursued the Apache. Armed with bows and arrows the Apache resisted the attack, pushing the Spanish back. The Spaniards eventually forded the river but were then overwhelmed. Some Apaches were also killed or wounded; exact numbers are unknown. A few Spaniards survived to tell the story.

== Aftermath ==
In August the fort finally received a shipment of weapons. Captain Francisco Ignacio de Trespalacios replaced the fallen commander and brought reinforcements to bring their number up to eighty-three men. In mid-November, 1776, Trespalacios led thirty of them to the mission of Magdalena, within modern day Mexico, on the San Ignacio River. When they arrived they found that forty Apaches had looted the settlement, murdered the inhabitants and burned the church. The incident became known as the Magdalena Massacre. Apache attacks on Fort Terrenate became so fierce that some 98 men perished while manning it, during only four years of its use; three of the dead were commanders.

On September 24, 1778, Captain Francisco Trespalacios and 27 of his soldiers were killed.

From November 1778 to February 1779, 39 soldiers were killed.

In May 1779, Captain Luis del Castille was killed.

== See also ==
- Capture of Tucson (1846)
- Capture of Tucson (1862)
- Siege of Tubac
- American Indian Wars
- Apache Wars
- Navajo Wars
