= Second Magdalena massacre =

- Location: Magdalena de Kino, Sonora, New Spain; Modern Day: Magdalena de Kino, Sonora, Mexico
- Date: One day in mid November 1776
- Attack type: Mass murder
- Perpetrator: Apache warriors

The Second Magdalena massacre was an attack by Apaches against the Spanish mission village of Magdalena de Kino, in northern Mexico. The attack occurred in mid-November 1776. Most or all of Magdalena de Kino's inhabitants were killed.

== Massacre ==
It was the second massacre in the town. In November 1757, Seri natives attacked and killed thirty-one civilians. Captain Francisco Ignacio de Trespalacios discovered the massacred colonists during a campaign from Presidio Santa Cruz de Terrenate with eighty-three cavalry men. Ignacoi replaced the fallen commander, Francisco Tovar, after the First Battle of Terrenate. The Spanish Army estimated that around forty Apaches had looted the settlement, murdered the inhabitants and burned the church.

== See also ==
- Capture of Tucson (1846)
- Capture of Tucson (1862)
- American Indian Wars
- Apache Wars
- Navajo Wars

== Sources ==
- Bancroft, Hubert Howe (1889). History of Arizona and New Mexico: 1530-1888. History Company.
- Cooper, Evelyn S. (1995). The Buehman Studio: Tucson in Focus. Arizona Historical Society. ISBN 978-0-910037-35-8.
- Dobyns, Henry F. (1976). Spanish colonial Tucson: a demographic history. Tucson, Ariz: University of Arizona press. ISBN 978-0-8165-0546-3.
- Drachman, Roy P. (1999). From Cowtown to Desert Metropolis: Ninety Years of Arizona Memories. Whitewing Press. ISBN 978-1-888965-02-5.
