= Light cavalry =

Type of highly mobile soldier on horseback

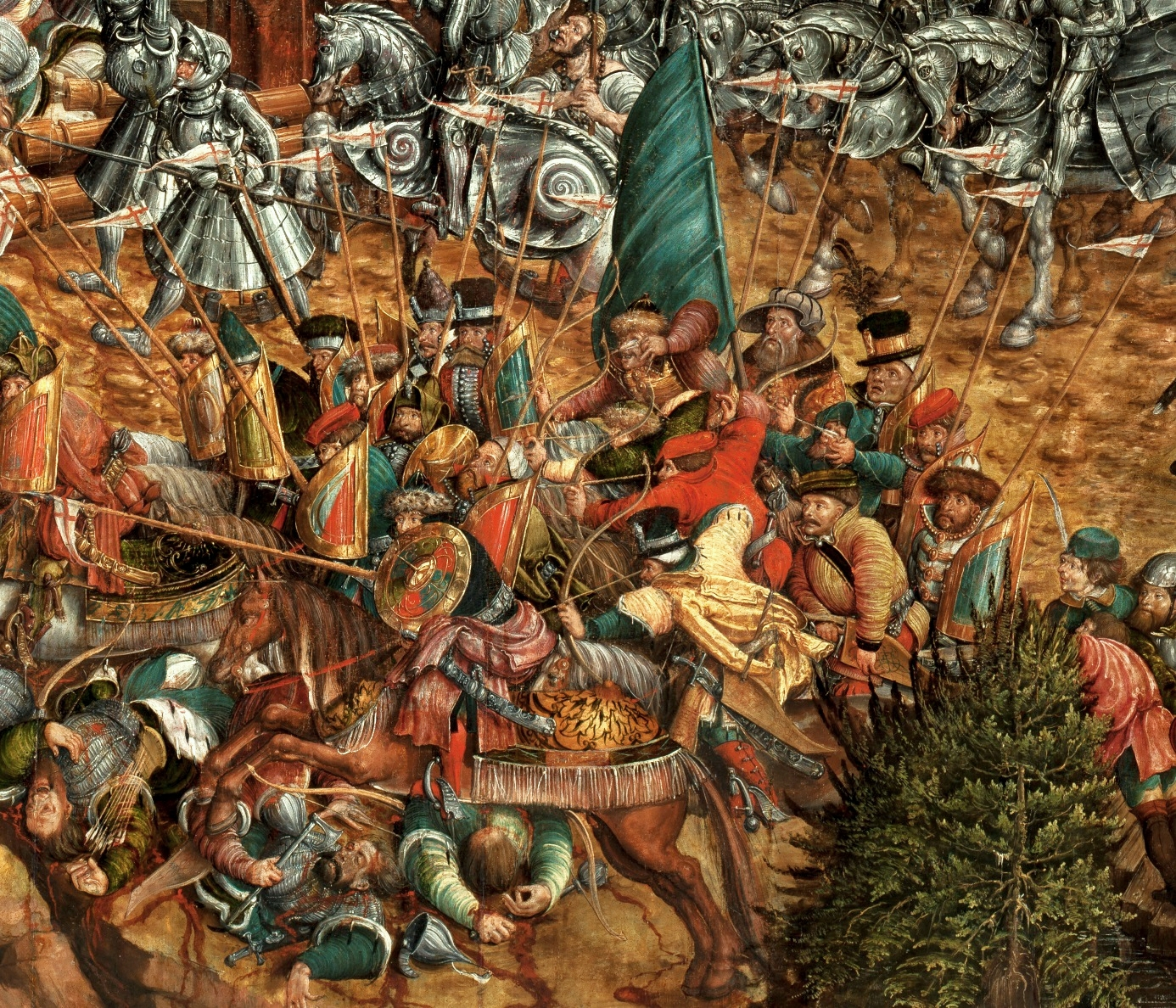
Polish-Lithuanian light cavalry during the Battle of Orsha in 1514, by Hans Krell

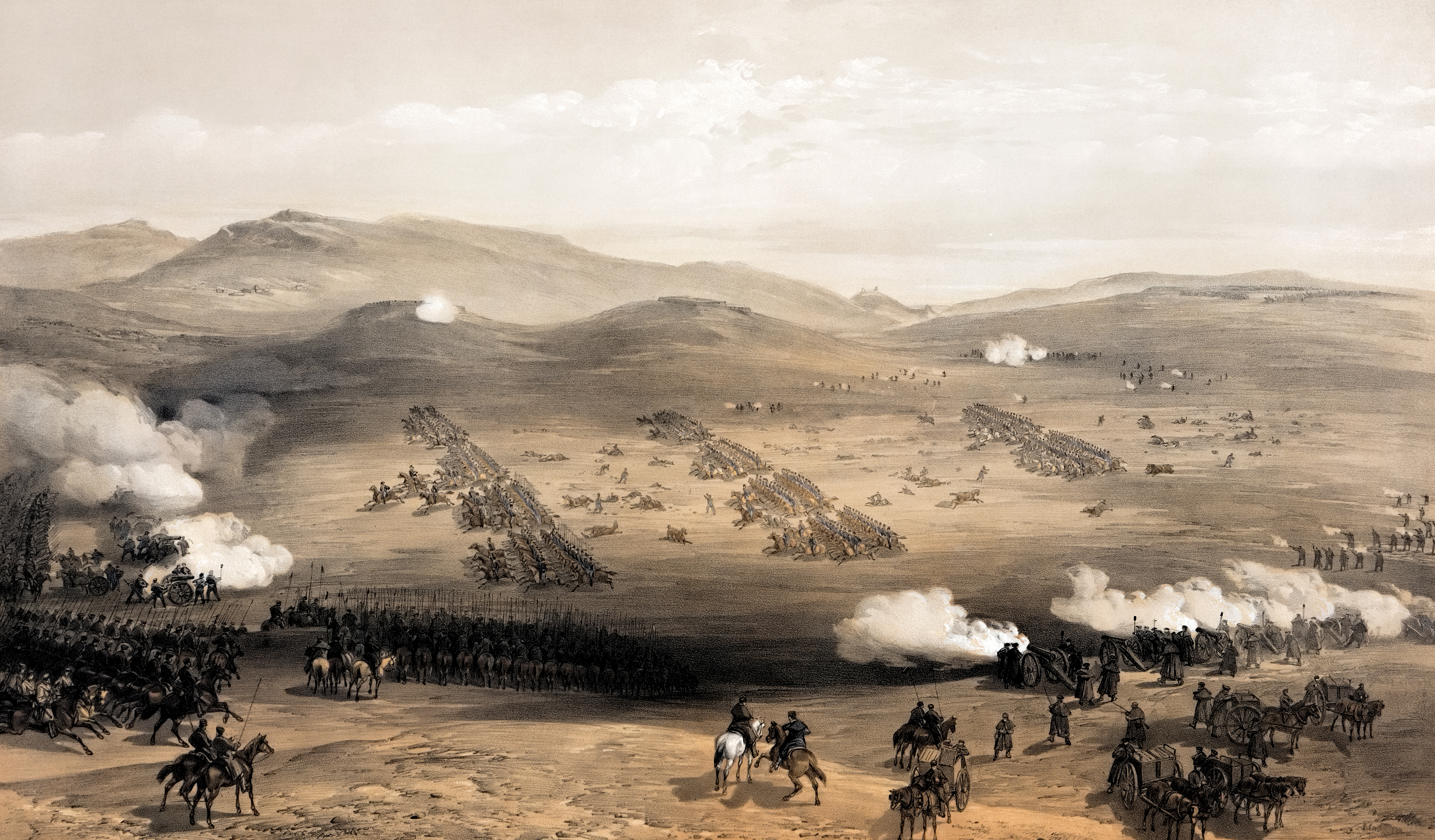
The Charge of the Light Brigade, in the Battle of Balaclava in 1854 (painted by William Simpson in 1855)

Light cavalry comprised lightly armed and armored cavalry troops mounted on fast horses, as opposed to heavy cavalry, where the mounted riders (and sometimes the warhorses) were heavily armored. The purpose of light cavalry was primarily raiding, reconnaissance, screening, skirmishing, patrolling, and tactical communications. Prior to the 17th century they were usually armed with swords, spears, javelins, or bows, and later on with sabres, pistols, shotguns, or carbines.

Light cavalry was used infrequently by Ancient Greeks (who used hippeis such as prodromoi or sarissophoroi) and Ancient Romans (who used auxiliaries such as equites Numidarum or equites Maurorum), but were more common among the armies of Eastern Europe, North Africa, West Asia, Central Asia, and East Asia. The Arabs, Cossacks, Hungarians, Huns, Kalmycks, Mongols, Turks, Parthians, and Persians were all proficient horse archers.

With the decline of feudalism and knighthood in Europe, light cavalry became more prominent in the armies of the continent. Many were equipped with early firearms, as their predecessors had been with bows or javelins. European examples of light cavalry included stradiots, hobelars, hussars, chasseurs à cheval, cossacks, chevau-légers, uhlans, and dragoons.

== Historical use ==
Armies of the ancient Roman-Germanic wars made use of light cavalry as patrolling squads, or armed scouts, and often had them in the front lines during regional battles.

During the Punic Wars, one of Carthage's main advantages over Roman armies was its extensive use of Numidian light cavalry. Partly because of this, the Roman general Scipio Africanus recruited his own cavalry from Sicily before his invasion of Tunisia during the Second Punic War.

=== Medieval period ===
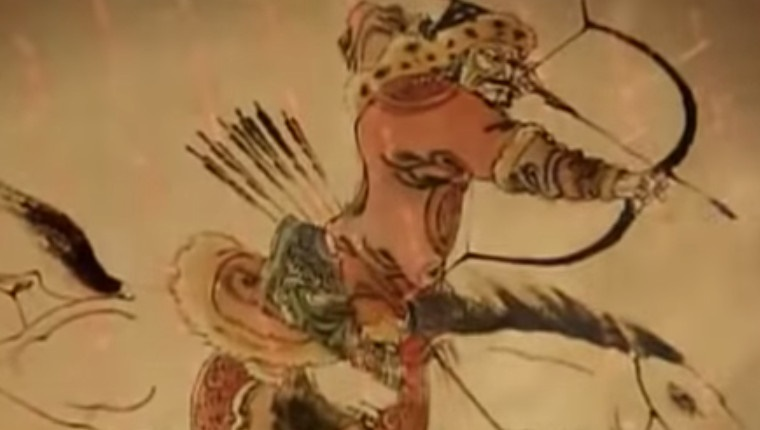
Mongol soldier on horseback, preparing a mounted archery shot

Several types of light cavalry were developed and used in medieval armies.

- Hobelar: Originally Irish, later popular in English and Scottish armies of the 14th and 15th centuries.
- Koursores: Byzantine light cavalry. The name derives from the Latin term cursor meaning 'runner'.
- Mobile Guard (Tulay'a mutaharikkah): An elite light cavalry regiment in the Rashidun army. With their ability to engage and disengage and turn back and attack again from the flank or rear, this mobile strike force inflicted shattering defeats on Byzantine and Sassanid armies. The best uses of this fast-moving cavalry regiment were at the Battle of Yarmouk and Battle of Walaja.
- Jinete: Spanish light horsemen, particularly popular during the Reconquista of the 8th to 16th century. They wore leather armor and were armed with javelins, a spear, a sword, and a shield.
- Stradiot: Of Albanian and Greek origin, used as mercenary light cavalry in Italy in the later 15th century.
- Turcopole: A light mounted archer used extensively during the Crusades in the Middle East but also found among the Teutonic Knights in their Baltic campaigns.
- Horse archers: Light or heavy cavalry primarily armed with bows. This allowed the Mongols to conquer large parts of Eurasia in the 13th century. Horse archers were also used extensively in steppe warfare throughout Central Asia and Eastern Europe, as well as the North American Great Plains.

=== Early Modern and Napoleonic periods ===
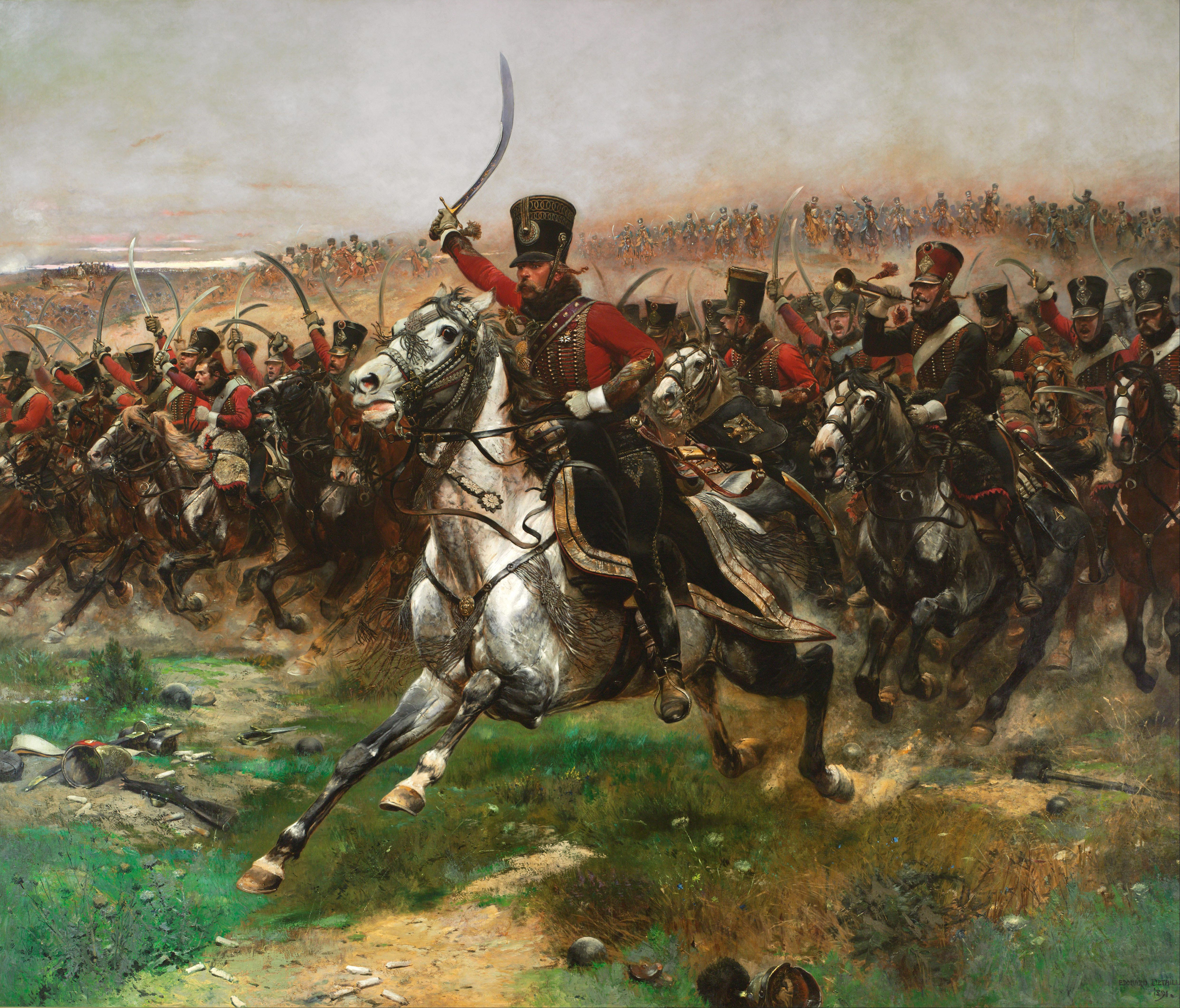
French 4th Hussars at the Battle of Friedland, 14 June 1807. Vive L'Empereur! by Édouard Detaille, 1891.

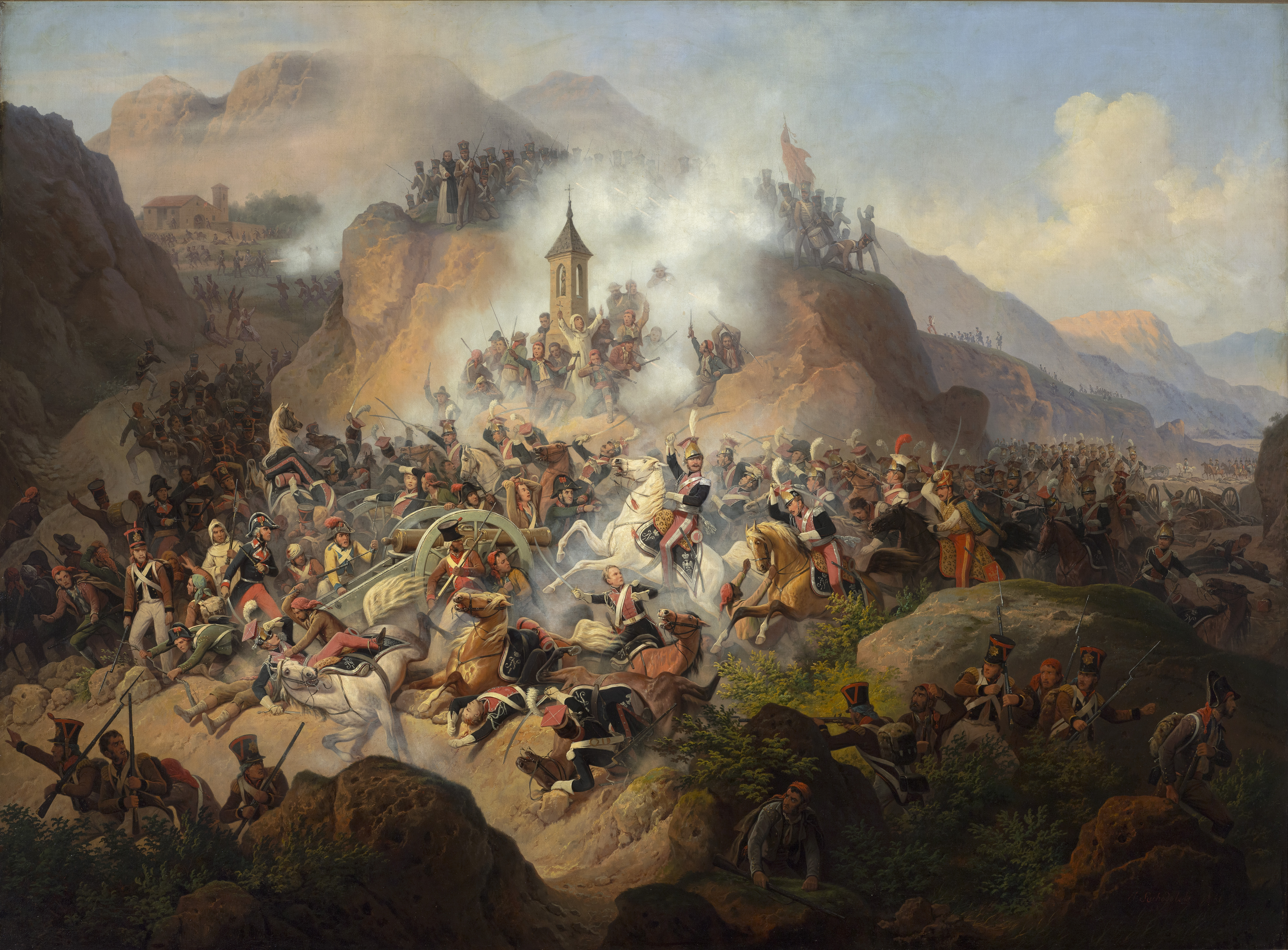
Polish cavalry at the Battle of Somosierra in Spain, 1808

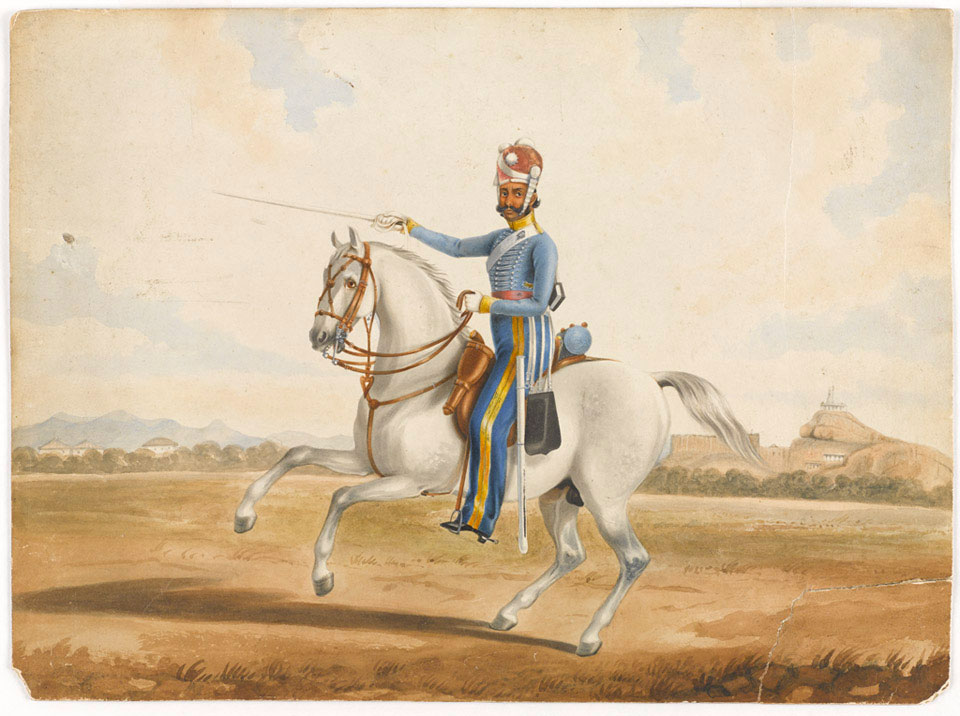
c. 1847 painting of a Madras Army sowar

Light cavalry played a key role in mounted scouting, escorting, and skirmishing during the Napoleonic era. Light horse also served a function in major set-piece battles. While lacking the sheer offensive power of heavy cavalry, light cavalry were still extremely effective against unprepared infantry, cavalry, and artillery. All infantry commanders were forced to respect the danger any cavalry presented to their forces, and light cavalry were effective at changing the movement of enemy forces simply through their presence. In the aftermath of battles, light cavalry were used to press a victor's advantage or to screen retreating forces from further attack.

- Akinji: Light cavalry, scout divisions, and advance troops of the Ottoman army. Unpaid and lived as a raider in the frontiers. Lightly armed and mounted on horseback, sometimes carrying melee weapons too. They mounted on special horses to outrun the enemy.
- Hussar: distinctively dressed light cavalry of Serbo-Hungarian origin. Locally recruited Hussar regiments were incorporated in most Napoleonic armies although by this period their functions and equipment were the same as other categories of light horse.
- Uhlan: Originally Polish light cavalry armed with a lance as their primary weapon, in addition to a saber and pistols. Locally recruited lancer regiments with this designation were later also used by the Russian, Prussian, and Austrian armies. The long reach of the lance made them an effective shock force against dispersed infantry.
- Carabinier: A mounted soldier armed primarily with a carbine, in addition to a saber and pistols. The carbine was considered a more appropriate firearm for cavalry use than a full-length musket or rifle, since it was lighter in weight, shorter in length, and easier to manipulate from horseback during combat. Carabiniers differed greatly between militaries, but were generally regarded as medium cavalry that used weapons and tactics that were complementary to mounted infantry.
- Dragoon: Originally a type of mounted infantry armed with a musket or lighter firearm and sword, dragoons had by the late eighteenth century evolved into heavy and light dragoon classes. The latter performed the usual functions of light cavalry, although they might undertake dismounted action using their firearm.
- Lancer: A mounted soldier armed primarily with a lance and tasked with charging enemy infantry, cavalry, and artillery formations on the battlefield. They also served in the light cavalry roles of scouting, screening, and skirmishing.
- Mamluk: A slave soldier, mercenary, or warrior that originated from Levantine and Egyptian peoples that served between the 9th to 19th century in the Islamic world with a higher social caste than most free peoples or citizens. They fought mostly as light horsemen armed with a lance, saber, javelins, pistols, or carbine.
- Sowar: Indian light horsemen usually armed with a lance, sword, or musket. Cavalry with this designation had comprised the bulk of Indian cavalry forces from the 16th to 19th century. Regiments of sowars designated as light cavalry were subsequently widely employed by the British East India Company.
- Chasseurs à cheval: the main element of the French light cavalry that performed the same functions as hussars.
- Spahi: light-cavalry regiments of the French army between 1830 and 1962, recruited primarily from the indigenous populations of North Africa.
- Cossack: Member of an East Slavic ethnic group famous for their irregular light horsemen armed with a lance, sword, bow, pistols, and musket and recruited on a semi-feudal basis from frontier communities. Required to provide their own horses and equipment and meet long-term service obligations in return for land grants. They played a major role in harassing the French and allied armies during the Retreat from Moscow of 1812.
- Soldado de cuera: Spanish light horsemen also known as the "leather-jacket soldiers" that served in the frontier garrisons of northern New Spain, the Presidios, from the late 16th to the early 19th century. They were armed primarily with a carbine, pistols, bow, lance, sword, and dagger. They also carried a bull-hide shield (adarga) or a small round metal shield (rodela) for defense against weapons such as swords, spears, javelins, and arrows.
- Hakkapeliitta: Finnish light horsemen from the 16th to 18th century. They were armed with pistols and a sword and wore a helmet and either a cuirass or leather armor. They played a vital role during the Thirty Years' War, serving King Gustavus Adolphus of Sweden and were highly praised for their skirmishing, raiding, and reconnaissance skills, as well as shock tactics.

=== Early 20th century ===
As late as the early 1900s, most European armies still retained a nominal division of mounted troops according to the size and weight of the men, into light cavalry (raiding, reconnaissance, and screening), medium cavalry (offense or defense), and heavy cavalry (direct shock). While colonial warfare had led to a blurring of these distinctions in the British Army, tradition remained strong in the cavalry arm of some other nations. As an example, the Imperial German Army maintained a marked difference between the sizes and weights of the men and horses allocated to the hussar regiments that made up its light cavalry and those of the other two categories. The early weeks of World War I saw light cavalry attempting to continue its long established function of being the "eyes and ears" of the respective main armies. However, despite some early success, the advent of trench warfare and aircraft observation quickly rendered this role obsolete, except to an extent in the Middle East in 1917, and in Eastern Europe where light cavalry mounted actions on a diminishing scale continued to occur until the Russian Revolution of 1917 took Russia out of the war.

== Late 20th century and modern day ==
During the Vietnam War, the US Army converted parts of the 1st Cavalry Division for heliborne tactics with a concept known as air cavalry. Helicopters were used to insert troops and support them. They were also used for suppression fire, search and rescue, medical evacuation, scouting and resupply. This concept was first tested at the Battle of Ia Drang Valley. Modern tactics call for the use of gunships to dominate the airspace and provide fire support while transport helicopters ferry ground forces and supply them.

Light reconnaissance vehicles (LRV) are also being used by cavalry squadrons and infantry scout units for scouting, skirmishing, and providing light fire support.

== See also ==
- Horses in warfare
- Waler horse
- Technical (vehicle)
