= Cilician Campaign of Constantine IV =

- Part of the Arab–Byzantine wars
Date	684–685
Location	Cilicia, Syria, and the Levant
Result	Byzantine victory

Belligerents
Byzantine Empire	Umayyad Caliphate

Commanders and leaders
Constantine IV	Abd al-Malik ibn Marwan

Strength
Unknown	Unknown

The Cilician Campaign of Constantine IV was a highly successful Byzantine military offensive launched during the final years of the reign of Emperor Constantine IV, who capitalized on the internal chaos gripping the Umayyad Caliphate during the Second Fitna. Constantine launched a swift counter-offensive that successfully reconquered Cilicia, forced an invasion into the Levant, and secured a highly lucrative peace treaty with the caliphate just prior to his death in July 685.

== Background ==
Map of the Byzantine Empire, c. 650

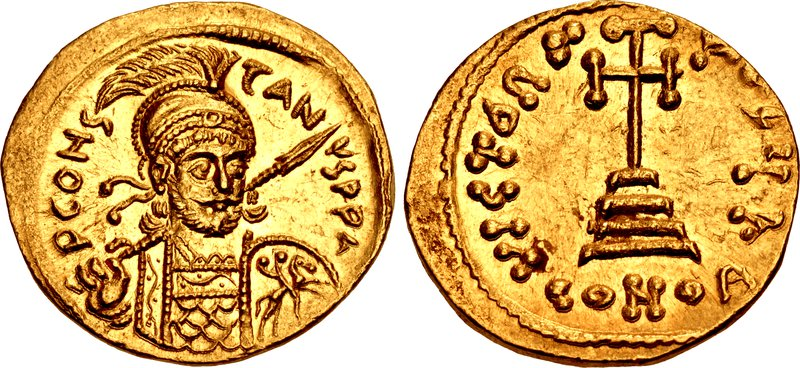
Solidus depicting the Byzantine emperor Constantine IV

The strategic catalyst for the campaign was the broader failure of the grueling Siege of Constantinople (674–678). For five years, the Umayyads had launched continuous naval assaults against the Byzantine capital, which the Byzantines successfully repelled using their formidable fortifications and the deployment of Greek fire. The Byzantines exploited their victory with amphibious operations, when soldiers drawn from the Mardaites were transported by the Byzantine navy and landed on the Lebanese coast between Tyre and Sidon. The Mardaites managed to secure a base of operations in Mount Lebanon, from which they conducted raiding and guerilla warfare operations against the Umayyads. These developments, combined with the catastrophic shipping and manpower losses suffered by the Arab fleet, forced Caliph Mu'awiya I to sue for peace, signing a 30-year truce and agreeing to pay an annual tribute to Constantinople. This defensive victory permanently halted the initial momentum of the early Muslim conquests, heavily elevated Constantine IV's prestige across Europe, and allowed the Byzantine Empire to transition off its desperate defensive footing.

Following the siege, the geopolitical balance shifted dramatically in 683, when the sudden death of Mu'awiya plunged the Umayyad state into the internal chaos of the Second Fitna. As rival factions fought for control of the caliphate, centralized authority over the northern frontiers dissolved entirely. Recognizing that the Arab garrisons were isolated and uncoordinated, Constantine IV resolved to break the truce early. He capitalized on the rare strategic window to launch an aggressive counter-offensive, aiming to permanently secure the empire's eastern borders and roll back decades of territorial losses.

== Campaign ==
=== Campaign and reconquest of Cilicia ===
In 684, Constantine mobilized the Byzantine field armies and marched southeasternly into the region of Cilicia, which had long served as a staging ground for Arab raids into Anatolia. Meeting fractured and uncoordinated Umayyad resistance, the imperial forces quickly overran the local Arab garrisons, re-establishing solid Byzantine administrative control over the Cilician plains and key fortresses like Mopsuestia.

=== Invasion of Syria and alliance with the Mardaites ===
To compound his territorial gains, Constantine IV pushed his forces past the Taurus Mountains directly into northern Syria and the Levant. The Byzantine navy conducted devastating coastal raids, while their army linked up with the Mardaites. Under Byzantine military sponsorship, the Mardites intensified their insurgent activities against the Umayyad interior, conducting deep raids into Palestine and successfully cutting off major Arab supply lines throughout Syria. It is possible that Byzantine forces inflicted further defeats upon the Umayyads during this campaign, or in another theatre about which the sources offer little detail, as the strategic pressure placed upon the newly elevated Caliph Abd al-Malik had to have been immense to force him into the treaty subsequently signed in 685. (Note: Peter Crawford proposes this as well as an alternate explanation, the latter being that Theophanes the Confessor transposed the harsh terms of the peace imposed on the Umayyads in 688 following the Caucasian Campaigns of Leontius to 685, in order to give Constantine IV credit for this highly favourable treaty rather than his more infamous son Justinian II.)

=== The 685 peace treaty ===
Faced with a devastating two-front dilemma—combating a domestic civil war while simultaneously trying to repel an aggressive Byzantine invasion—Abd al-Malik immediately sued for peace. In early 685, the caliph signed a treaty heavily dictated by Constantinople. Under the agreed terms, the Umayyads accepted the permanent loss of Cilicia and consented to pay a large, increased annual tribute to the Byzantine Empire, consisting of 365,000 gold pieces, 365 slaves, and 365 thoroughbred horses. Concurrently, seeing the sudden shift in hegemony, a majority of the Armenian regional lords officially requested and received protectorate status under the Byzantine crown. (Note: Peter Crawford suggests that such a massive annual tribute to Byzantium may be exaggerated by Theophanes and the Syriac sources. He proposes that the frequency of payment described by al-Tabari, that being a dispatch of tribute every Friday, may be closer to the truth.)

== Significance ==
=== Peak of foreign policy and death ===
The Cilician campaign represented the zenith of Constantine IV's foreign policy and external diplomacy. His combined defensive victory at Constantinople and aggressive offensive into the Levant successfully reversed nearly half a century of uninterrupted Arab expansion. This massive diplomatic and territorial triumph solidified the Anatolian buffer zone and marked the peak of Constantine IV's foreign policy just prior to his sudden death from dysentery in July 685. He left the empire in its most secure geopolitical position since the reign of Emperor Heraclius.

=== Justinian II and the Treaty of 688 ===
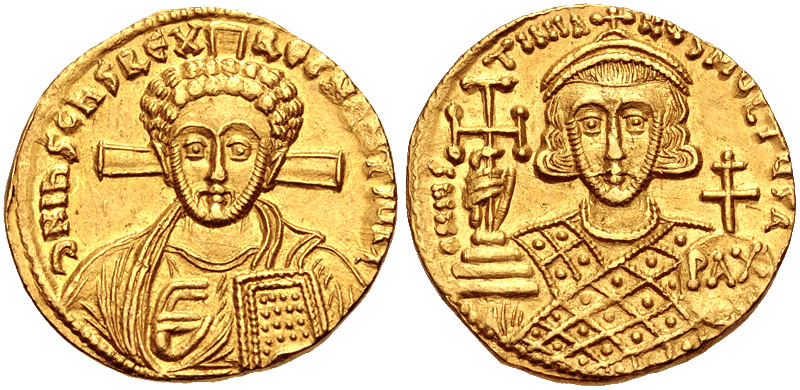
Solidus depicting Emperor Justinian II

The highly favourable geopolitical environment inherited from Constantine IV was passed directly to his 16-year-old son and successor, Justinian II. With the caliphate of Abd al-Malik still mired in the second Fitna, Justinian exploited the situation to attain further gains, dispatching his general Leontius into Transcaucasia, where the Byzantines inflicted a series of defeats upon the Arabs. These victories forced Caliph Abd al-Malik to sign an even more lucrative treaty in 687 or 688 that split the revenues of Cyprus, Armenia, and Iberia.

Resettlement of the Mardaites

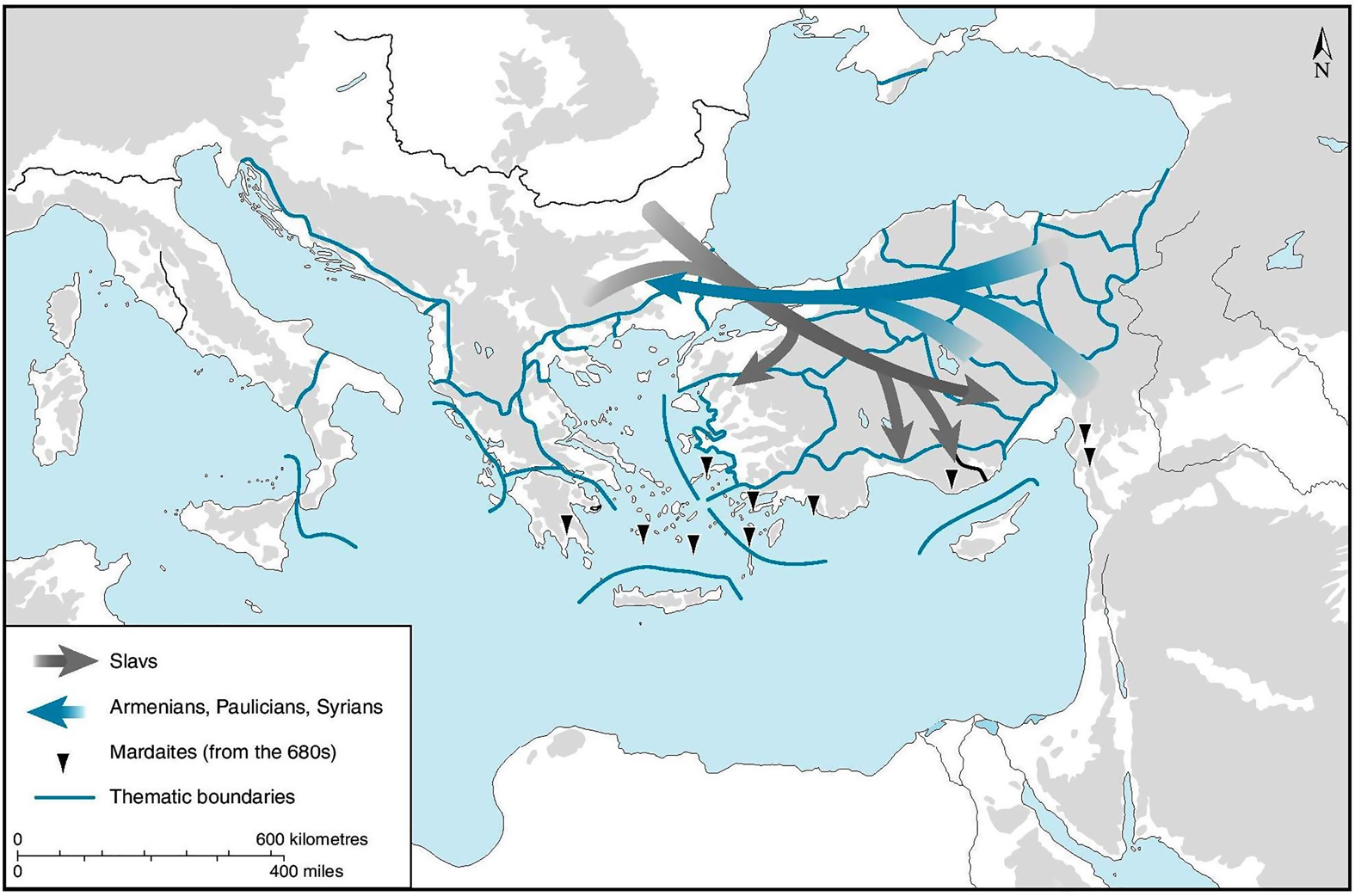
Map depicting forced resettlements within the empire after 685.

In an effort to appease the caliph and secure the treaty long-term, Justinian II agreed to dismantle the Lebanese guerrilla networks. He forcibly relocated over 12,000 Mardaites from the Syrian frontiers into internal regions of the empire like Pamphylia and Greece. This act permanently removed a vital Christian buffer force that had severely paralyzed Umayyad internal movements.

== Bibliography ==
- Kaegi, Walter E. (1992). Byzantium and the Early Islamic Conquests. Cambridge University Press. ISBN 978-0-521-48455-8.
- Lilie, Ralph-Johannes (1976). Die byzantinische Reaktion auf die Ausbreitung der Araber. Studien zur Strukturwandlung des byzantinischen Staates im 7. und 8. Jhd [The Byzantine Response to the Spread of the Arabs. Studies on the structural change of the Byzantine state in the 7th and 8th centuries] (in German). Munich: Institut für Byzantinistik und Neugriechische Philologie der Universität München. OCLC 797598069.
- Kaegi, Walter E. (2003). Heraclius, Emperor of Byzantium. Cambridge University Press. ISBN 978-0-521-81459-1.
- Ostrogorsky, George (1969). History of the Byzantine State. Rutgers University Press. ISBN 978-0-8135-0599-2.
- Treadgold, Warren (1997). A History of the Byzantine State and Society. Stanford University Press. ISBN 978-0-8047-2630-6.
- Crawford, Peter (2021). Justinian II: The Roman Emperor Who Lost his Nose and his Throne and Regained Both. Pen & Sword History. ISBN 978 1 52675 531 5.
- Jankowiak, Marek (2013). "The First Arab Siege of Constantinople". In Zuckerman, Constantin (ed.). Travaux et mémoires, Vol. 17: Constructing the Seventh Century. Paris: Association des Amis du Centre d’Histoire et Civilisation de Byzance. pp. 237–320.
