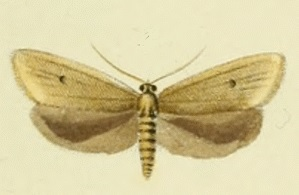

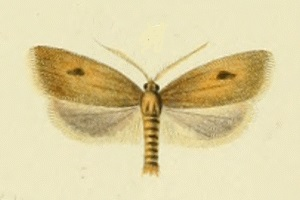

Scientific classification
- Domain: Eukaryota
- Kingdom: Animalia
- Phylum: Arthropoda
- Class: Insecta
- Order: Lepidoptera
- Family: Tortricidae
- Genus: Avaria
- Species: A. hyerana

Binomial name
- Avaria hyerana (Millière, 1858)

Synonyms
- Hastula hyerana Millière, 1858; Hastula hyerana ab. alpha Chapman, 1906; Amphisa (Tortrix) joannisiana Ragonot, 1888; Tortrix (Amphysa) lithosiana Kennel, 1899; Hastula hyerana var. marginata Chapman, 1905; Hastula hyerana ab. marginula Chapman, 1906; Hastula hyerana ab. nigropunctata Chapman, 1906; Hastula hyerana ab. obsolescens Chapman, 1906; Tortrix osseana Laharpe, 1860; Hastula hyerana var. pallens Chapman, 1906; Sciaphila reynana Staudinger, in Staudinger & Wocke, 1861

= Avaria hyerana =

Species of moth

Avaria hyerana is a species of moth of the family Tortricidae. It is found in Portugal, Spain, France, Italy, Greece, North Macedonia and on Sardinia, Sicily, Malta and the Canary Islands.

The wingspan is 20–25 mm. Adults have been recorded on wing from September to October.

The larvae feed on Asphodelus species. Larvae have been recorded in April.

== Gallery ==
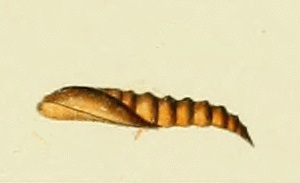

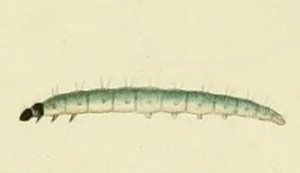
