= Presidio Santa Cruz de Terrenate =

Spanish-era fortress in Cochise County, Arizona, United States

Coordinates: 31°45′03″N 110°12′07″W

- Cochise County, Arizona
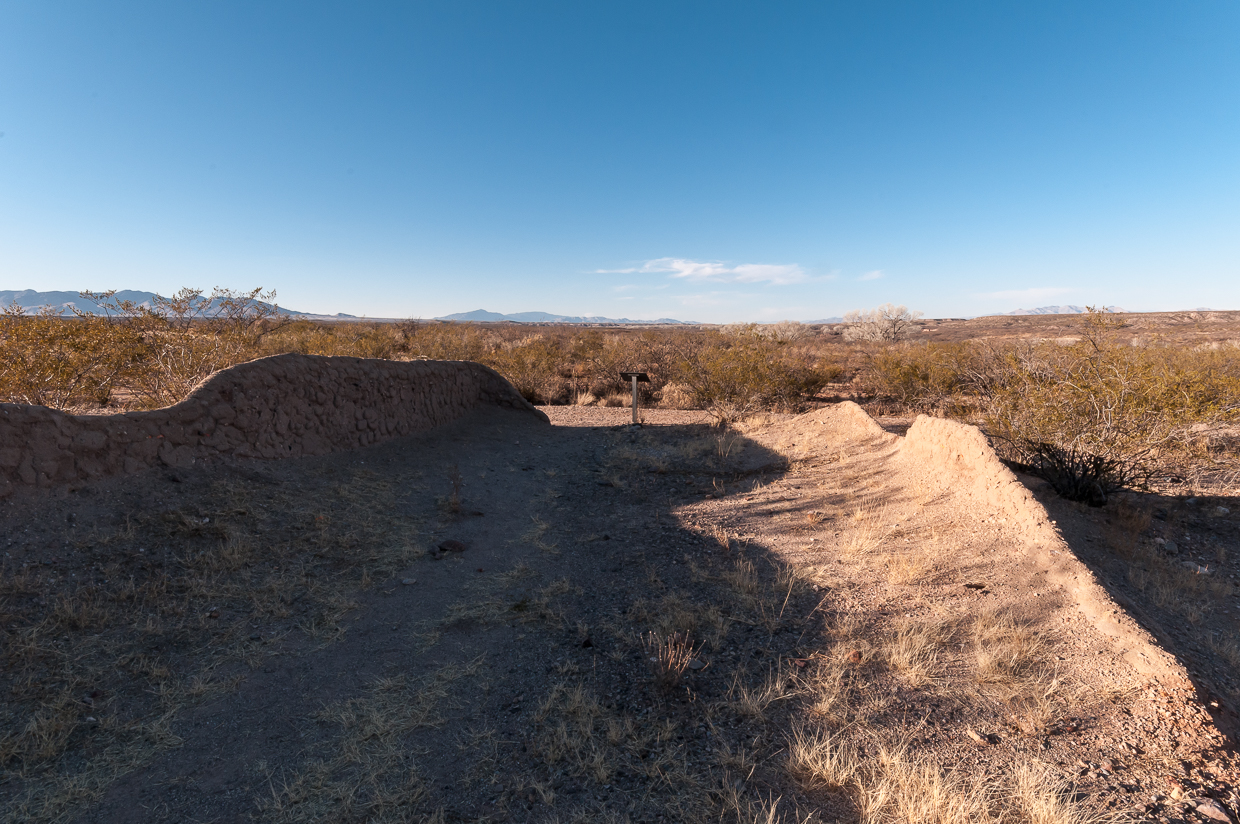
- Ruins of the presidio

Site information
- Type: Army fortification
- Controlled by: Arizona

Site history
- Built: 1776
- Built by: Spain
- In use: 1776–1780, 1878

Garrison information
- Past commanders: (Spain) Francisco Tovar
- Occupants: (Spain) Spanish Army; United States Army

The Presidio Santa Cruz de Terrenate is a former Spanish military presidio, or fortress, located roughly west of the town of Tombstone, Arizona, in the United States of America.

== History ==
Presidio Santa Cruz de Terrenate established at the headwaters of the San Pedro River was founded in 1742, and served as a way station on the between Presidio Fronteras (commanded by Juan Bautista de Anza Sasoeta, also known as Anza the elder) and Anza Sasoeta's ranches near Guevavi, where some new missions had been founded in 1732. There was also a silver mine, the Real de Terrenate near the Presidio, and several other prospecting sites on the road between Fronteras and Guevavi.

In 1775, an Irish-born Spanish Army Colonel, Hugo Oconór (Hugh O'Conor) for the King Charles III of Spain moved Terrenate to a bluff overlooking the San Pedro River, and for him, the presidio served as one link in a chain of presidios that extended from Los Adaes in the east to Alta California in the west. Like all frontier presidios in the Viceroyalty of New Spain, Santa Cruz de Terrenate was garrisoned by soldados de cuera. The presidio was never completed to specifications due to corruption. The presidio was abandoned in 1780 due to numerous problems, such as the lack of crops, raids on the horse herds, surprise attacks on the mule trains carrying supplies, and recurrent attacks by Apache warriors (notably the First Battle of Terrenate). These factors led to the abandonment of the garrison in 1780. The fortress was briefly occupied by the United States Army in 1878, but abandoned later that year.

In 1951, Charles DiPeso excavated the site and discovered evidence that suggested that O'Conor had constructed the presidio upon the abandoned Sobaipuri village of Quiburi. Later historians and archaeologists suggested that the structures found at the site were quarters of the soldiers of the presidio and their families (Gerald 1968; Seymour 1989). One reason for this later opinion is that the Sobaipuri people did not live in adobe-walled structures. Secondly, the historic record does not place Quiburi in this location. In fact, Santa Cruz was the name of the Sobaipuri settlement located here before the construction of the presidio, and this provided the basis for the name of the presidio (SANTA CRUZ de Terrenate) and ultimately for the Santa Cruz River (Seymour 2011, 2012, 2013, 2014).

Further archaeological excavations were conducted from 2007 through 2010. These excavations yielded evidence showing that the presidio was indeed constructed upon a pre-existing Sobaipuri site, but historical documents indicate that it was not Quiburi (Seymour 1989, 2011, 2013, 2014). Additionally, Hohokam and Archaic occupations were also in evidence preceding the occupation of the presidio. Evidence of the prehistoric Hohokam occupation consists of pottery fragments scattered on the surface and eroding out of the adobe walls of the later Spanish presidio. Archaic arrowheads and tools are present on the surface, in adobe walls, and in house fills, having eroded from the walls of the citadel.

== Sources ==
- Di Peso, Charles 1953 "The Sobaipuri Indians of the Upper San Pedro River Valley, Southwestern Arizona". Dragoon, AZ: Amerind Foundation Publication No. 6.
- Gerald, Rex E. 1968 "Spanish Presidios of the Late Eighteenth Century in Northern New Spain". Museum of New Mexico Research Records, Number 7. Museum of New Mexico Press, Santa Fe.
- Seymour, Deni J. 1989 "The Dynamics of Sobaipuri Settlement in the Eastern Pimeria Alta". Journal of the Southwest 31(2):205–22.
- Seymour, Deni J. 2011 "Where the Earth and Sky are Sewn Together: Sobaípuri-O’odham Contexts of Contact and Colonialism". University of Utah Press, SLC.
- Seymour, Deni J. 2012 "Santa Cruz River: The Origin of a Place Name". Journal of Arizona History 53(1):81–88.
- Seymour, Deni J. 2013 "San Pablo de Quiburi: The Sobaípuri-O'odham Ranchería of Kino's Conception". New Mexico Historical Review.
- Seymour, Deni J. 2014 "Evaluating Di Peso's 1767 Jesuit Mission at Santa Cruz de Terrenate Presidio". Journal of the Southwest.
- Seymour, Deni J. 2014 "A Fateful Day in 1698: The Remarkable Sobaípuri O’odham Victory over the Enemies of the Sonoran Province". University of Utah Press, SLC.
