= Avaria constanti =

Scientific classification
- Domain: Eukaryota
- Kingdom: Animalia
- Phylum: Arthropoda
- Class: Insecta
- Order: Lepidoptera
- Family: Tortricidae
- Genus: Avaria
- Species: A. constanti

Binomial name
- Avaria constanti (Rebel, in Rebel & Rogenhofer, 1894)

Synonyms
- Dichelia constanti Rebel, in Rebel & Rogenhofer, 1894

Species of moth

Avaria constanti is a species of moth of the family Tortricidae. It is found on the Canary Islands.

The wingspan is 13–14 mm. The forewings are yellowish brown with brownish sprinkling and reddish to blackish-brown markings. The hindwings are greyish brown.
