= Avar (surname) =

Avar is a surname. Notable people with the surname include:

- Sıdıka Avar (1901–1979), Turkish teacher
- István Avar (1905–1977), German footballer
- János Avar (1938–2021), Hungarian journalist
