= Caucasian Campaigns of Leontius =

686–88 Byzantine defeat of the Umayyads

- Part of the Byzantine–Arab wars
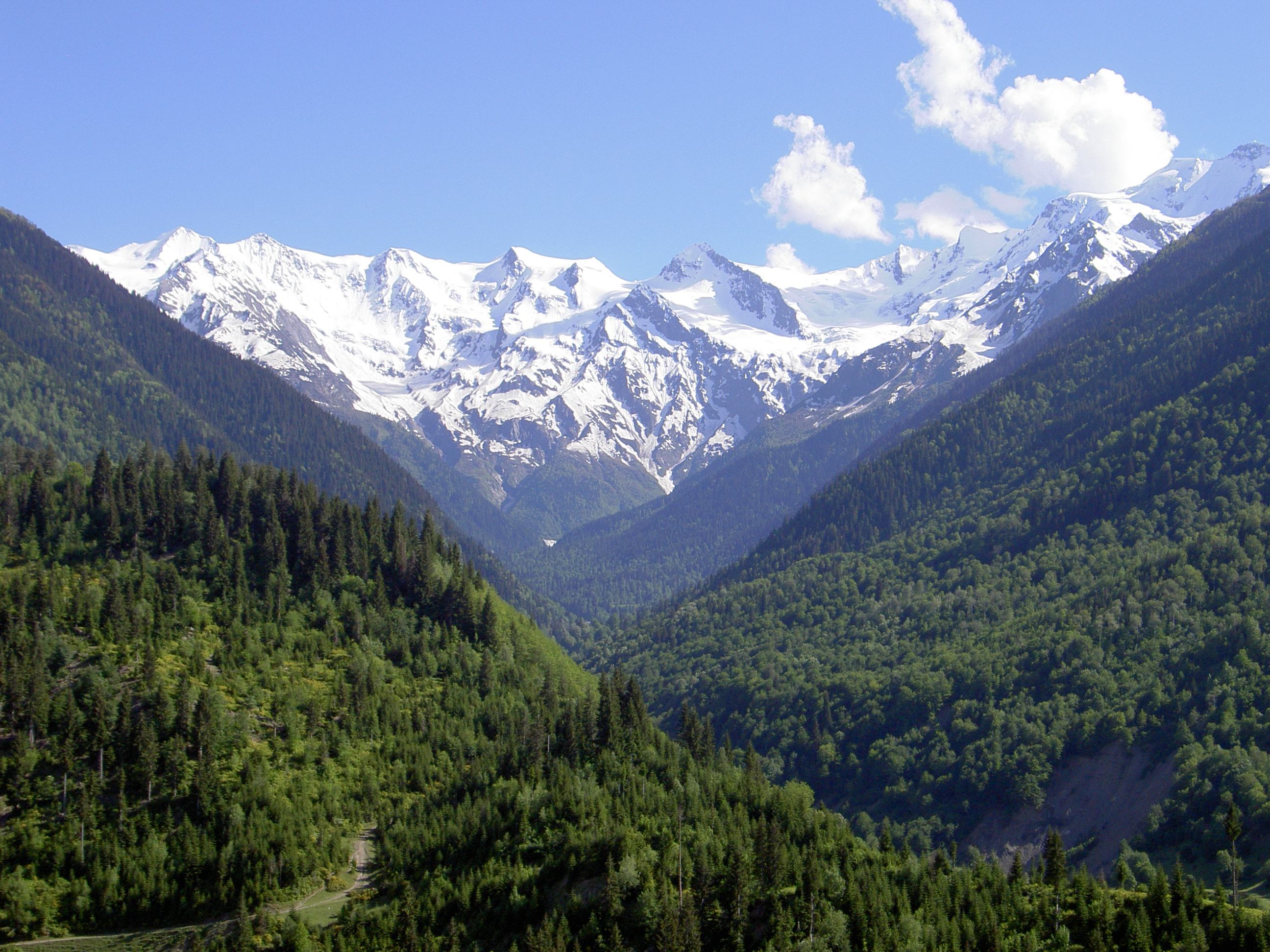
- Caucasus Mountains in Svaneti
Date	686–688
Location	Transcaucasia, Armenia, Iberia, Caucasian Albania, Media
Result	Byzantine victory
Territorial changes	Umayyad garrisons expelled from Transcaucasia; Umayyad Caliphate sues for peace

Belligerents
Byzantine Empire; Pro-Kamsarakan Armenians	Umayyad Caliphate; Emirate of Armenia; Albanian client levies

Commanders and leaders
Justinian II; Leontius Nerses Kamsarakan	Abd al-Malik ibn Marwan Ashot II Bagratuni; Prince Varaz

Strength
Unknown number of forces from the Anatolikon Theme and allied noble hosts	Unknown

Casualties and losses
Unknown	Heavy

The Caucasian Campaigns of Leontius (686–688) were major military offensive orchestrated by the Byzantine Emperor Justinian II into Transcaucasia, and commanded by the general Leontius. The expedition capitalized on severe internal instability within the Umayyad Caliphate caused by the Second Fitna, and as a result Byzantine forces successfully expelled Arab garrisons from Armenia and Iberia, penetrating deep into Caucasian Albania and Media, reaching the northern frontiers of the Iranian plateau. The campaign was characterized by its immense territorial scope and heavy looting. It concluded with a sweeping strategic victory for Constantinople, forcing the Umayyad Caliph Abd al-Malik ibn Marwan to sue for peace and sign a highly favourable peace treaty in 688.

== Background ==
The Byzantine Empire and Umayyad Caliphate in 650

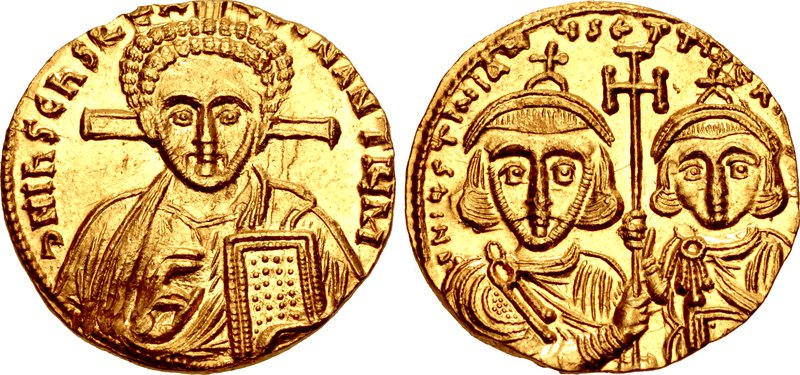
Solidus depicting Christ Pantokrator, Emperor Justinian II and his son, Tiberius

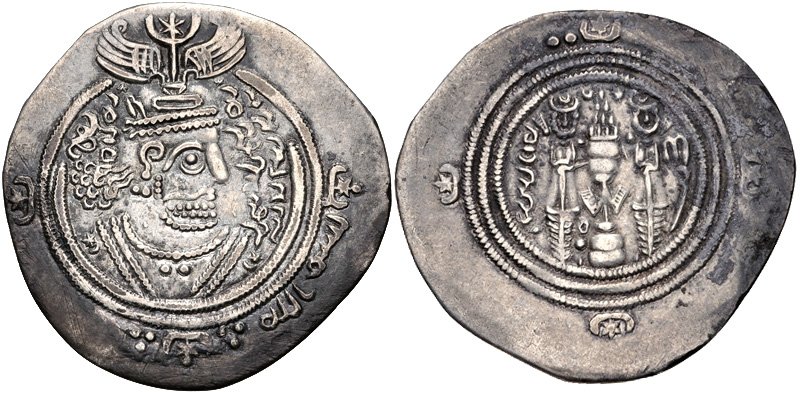
Sasanian-inspired silver dirham depicting Caliph Abd al-Malik ibn Marwan

Upon the death of Emperor Constantine IV in 685, his 16-year-old son, Justinian II, inherited a relatively stable empire. Concurrently, the rival Umayyad Caliphate had been dealing with the Second Fitna. The Caliph Abd al-Malik faced overlapping domestic threats, including the counter-caliphate of Abd Allah ibn al-Zubayr in the Hejaz, Kharijite rebellions, and regional insurrections in Lower Mesopotamia. Recognizing that Damascus was poorly positioned to defend its northern peripheral frontiers, Justinian decided to transition from a defensive posture to aggressive expansionism, and consequently to pressure the Umayyads both directly and indirectly. The Byzantine navy was dispatched to conduct maritime attacks against Umayyad possessions along the Syrian and Levantine coasts. According to al-Baladhuri, the cities of Tyre, Ascalon, Caesarea Maritima, Acre and Tripoli were sacked by the Byzantine fleet at this time. Additonally, the Mardaites began raiding Umayyad Syria with increased vigor, even managing to capture Antioch from the Arabs. This was a dangerous development for Abd al-Malik, as by now the pro-Ali Shiite rebels of Mukhtar al-Thaqafi had been crushed by the forces of Abdallah ibn al-Zubayr and his brother Mus'ab, securing Mesopotamia under Zubayrid control, and allowing al-Zubayr to prepare offensives against Abd al-Malik. The Byzantine-Mardaite incursions thus occurred at a critical time for Abd al-Malik. (Note: al-Mukhtar's uprising fought with equal determination against Abdallah ibn al-Zubayr's Zybarids as did against Abd al-Maliks Umayyads. Thus while it was active, it tied up the Zybarids from applying further pressure against the Umayyads. Once the three-way conflict ended with al-Mukhtar's defeat, the Zubayrids refocused their efforts against the Umayyad powerbase in Syria)

In addition to the strategic pressures directed against Syria, Justinian reorganized the elite thematic forces of the Anatolian Theme district and placed them under the direct field command of Leontius, who had been an able and loyal general under his father Constantine IV. The first projected campaign would cross from Eastern Anatolia into the Caucasus, with the objective of eliminating the forward operating Arab bases in Transcaucasia and reasserting historical Roman hegemony over the Christian principalities of the region. Both Armenia and Iberia had rebelled from the caliphate in the years prior to Jusinian II's ascension. However, the princes of these realms were defeated and killed while fighting a Khazar invasion of the Transcaucasus, after which Umayyad armies had managed to subdue these nations as Arab protectorates. In turn, the Byzantines may have targeted these regions as they could expect to receive the support of some natives in the region dissatisfied with Arab rule.

== Campaigns ==
Roman-Persian Frontier in Late Antiquity (4th-7th centuries)

Having advanced from Eastern Anatolia, Leontius soon confronted the Umayyad armies stationed in Armenia as an occupying force. The two sides engaged in fighting, from which the Byzantines ultimately emerged victorious, annihilating the Umayyad troops. Leontius was able to exploit this success to drive the Arabs out of Armenia altogether, reportedly restoring the country as a Byzantine protectorate. According to the Armenian historian Łewond, the conflict for Armenia between the Arabs and the invading Byzantine army was highly destructive, with the Byzantine army devastating and plundering the region, destroying numerous buildings in the towns and cities which they captured.

The substantial success attained by Leontius in Armenia brought further military opportunities for the Byzantines. Leontius, in a development almost certainly approved by Justinian, carried his attacks further east. He led his men into the distant regions of Iberia, Albania, Boukania and Media, which Theophanes claimed to have been conquered by the Byzantines in the ensuing conflict. Operational details of the course of these offensives have not survived, but Leontius attained numerous victories in these countries by defeating and expelling Umayyad forces, with considerable plunder and prestige attained by Byzantine arms. Although Theophanes narrates these operations in the form of single grand campaign by Leontius, the conflict lasted multiple years and involved a very wide geographical area. Consequently, Peter Crawford reasons that the Byzantines conducted several offensives against the northern possessions and clients of the Umayyads during the years following his initial victory in Armenia. Leontius dispatched the massive quantities of plunder collected by his men during these incursions back to Constantinople. In late 686 or 687, Justinian personally travelled to Armenia, likely to oversee the conduct of the campaigns and provide further directives for Leontius and his men.

== Treaty of 688 ==
The successes achieved by Byzantine forces under Leontius facilitated a revival of Byzantine power in the Caucasus. These victories, along with the naval operations and Mardaite activities, compelled Abd al-Malik to renew the previously established treaty with Byzantium with further concessions to the empire, as securing his northwestern flank and powerbase in Syria would be of crucial strategic importance in his civil war against Abdallah ibn al-Zubayr.

The terms concluded in the peace treaty of 688 included:

- Continued payment of the tribute established in 685

- Payment of 1,000 nomismata per day to Byzantium (amounting to roughly 365,000 nomismata per year)
- Tribute of 1 horse per day to Byzantium
- Tribute of 1 slave per day to Byzantium (Note: Peter Crawford suggests that such a massive annual tribute to Byzantium may be exaggerated by Theophanes and the Syriac sources. He proposes that the frequency of payment described by al-Tabari, that being a dispatch of tribute every Friday, may be closer to the truth.)

- Payments of silk garment to Byzantium
- Establishment of a condominium over Armenia, Iberia, and Cyprus, wherein revenue of these regions would be shared equally between the caliphate and empire
- Withdrawal of 12,000 Mardaites from the Syrian coast and resettlement in Byzantine territory

== Aftermath ==
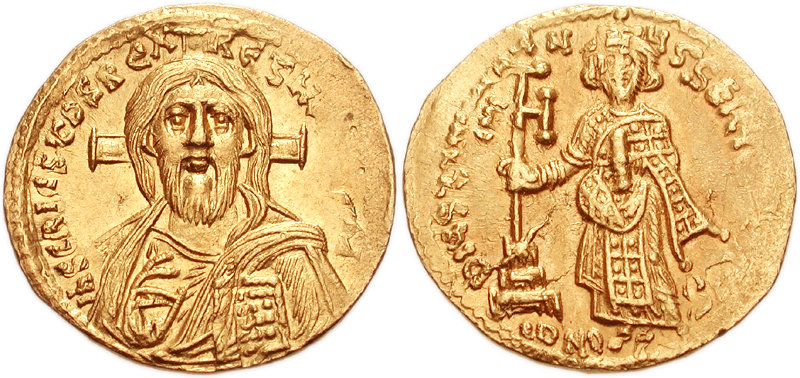
Solidus depicting Christ Pantokrator and Emperor Justinian II

By 692, the Second Fitna began nearing its end, following the decisive victory of abd al-Malik against the Zubayrid at the Battle of Maskin. With the remaining Zubayrids under siege by an Umayyad army in Mecca, al-Malik was finally free to consolidate his position and refocus his military efforts against the Byzantines. Justinian had in the meantime consolidated his position, boosted by Leontius' victories and further successes won against the Slavs and Bulgars. Further conflict arose over the specific nomismata paid in the tribute, as Justinian introduced a new coin displaying both his own portrait and that of Christ. The coins minted in the caliphate had previously copied Byzantine nomismata and even included the emperor’s portrait, but Abd al-Malik introduced new, lighter coins of his own, which omitted from depicting Christ. When these coins were dispatched to Constantinople, Justinian rejected the tribute on the grounds that the new Umayyad coins did not meet the standards of the Byzantine ones. Declaring the omission of Christ to represent a breach of the 688 treaty, and confident from the previous military successes during his reign, Justinian began preparations for a new conflict with the Umayyads. Warfare between the Umayyads and Byzantines resumed in 692, with the Arabs attaining a major victory at the Battle of Sebastopolis. This success ended the period of Byzantine ascendancy which had begun in 678 and facilitated the resumption of near annual sawa'if raids by the Umayyad Caliphate into Asia Minor.

== Bibliography ==
- Crawford, Peter (2021). Justinian II: The Roman Emperor Who Lost his Nose and his Throne and Regained Both. Pen & Sword History. ISBN 978 1 52675 531 5.
- Lilie, Ralph-Johannes (1976). Die byzantinische Reaktion auf die Ausbreitung der Araber. Studien zur Strukturwandlung des byzantinischen Staates im 7. und 8. Jhd [The Byzantine Response to the Spread of the Arabs. Studies on the structural change of the Byzantine state in the 7th and 8th centuries] (in German). Munich: Institut für Byzantinistik und Neugriechische Philologie der Universität München. OCLC 797598069.
- Turtledove, Harry (1982). 'The Chronicle of Theophanes' An English translation of anni mundi 6095-6305 (a.p. 602-813), with introduction and notes. Philadelphia: University of Pennsylvania Press. ISBN 0-8122-7842-9.
- Treadgold, Warren (1997). A History of the Byzantine State and Society. Stanford, California: Stanford University Press. ISBN 978-0804779371.
- Lilie, Ralph-Johannes; Ludwig, Claudia; Pratsch, Thomas; Zielke, Beate (2013). Prosopographie der mittelbyzantinischen Zeit Online. Berlin-Brandenburgische Akademie der Wissenschaften. Nach Vorarbeiten F. Winkelmanns erstellt (in German). Berlin and Boston: De Gruyter.
