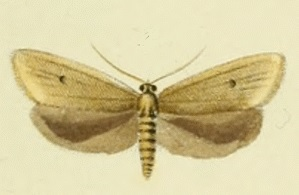
- Avaria hyerana

Scientific classification
- Kingdom: Animalia
- Phylum: Arthropoda
- Clade: Pancrustacea
- Class: Insecta
- Order: Lepidoptera
- Family: Tortricidae
- Tribe: Archipini
- Genus: Avaria; Kocak, 1981

Synonyms
- Hastula Millière, 1858 (preocc.)

= Avaria (moth) =

Genus of tortrix moths

Avaria is a genus of moths belonging to the subfamily Tortricinae of the family Tortricidae.

== Species ==
- Avaria constanti (Rebel, in Rebel & Rogenhofer, 1894)
- Avaria hyerana (Millière, 1858)

== See also ==
- List of Tortricidae genera
