= Eurasian Avars =

Eurasian Avars may refer to:

- Avars (Caucasus), a people from the North East Caucasus
  - Avar Khanate, Caucasus
- Pannonian Avars, a nomadic people who lived on the Eurasian Steppes, before settling in Central Europe
  - Avar Khaganate, Central Europe

== See also ==
- Avars (disambiguation)
