= János Avar =

Hungarian journalist (1938–2021)

- Born: 13 June 1938; Rožňava, Czechoslovakia
- Died: 2 December 2021 (aged 83); Budapest, Hungary
- Burial place: Farkasréti Cemetery
- Education: Karl Marx University of Economic Sciences, (1960)
- Occupation: Journalist
- Awards: Ferenc Rózsa Award (1985)

János Avar (13 June 1938 – 2 December 2021) was a Hungarian journalist. Avar was born in 1938. He died on 2 December 2021, at the age of 83.
