= Sufyan ibn Awf =

Arab military commander

Sufyān ibn ʿAwf ibn al-Mughaffal al-Azdī al-Ghāmidī (Arabic: سفيان بن عوف بن المغفل الأزدي الغامدي) (died 672 or 673/674) was an Arab commander in the service of the Rashidun caliphs Umar (r. 634–644) and Uthman (r. 644–656) and the Umayyad caliph Mu'awiya I (r. 661–680). He fought as a partisan of Mu'awiya against Caliph Ali during the First Muslim Civil War, leading a raid against the latter's forces in Iraq. Throughout his military career, he was major commander in the wars with the Byzantine Empire. Though the medieval Arabic, Greek and Syriac accounts are not entirely consistent, he most likely was at the head of a large Arab army that was decisively defeated by the Byzantines in 673/74 and was slain during the battle.

== Life ==
Sufyan belonged to the Ghamid branch of the Azd Sarat tribe resident in the southern Hejaz (western Arabia). He was a companion of the Islamic prophet Muhammad. During the Muslim conquest of Byzantine Syria, he took part in the siege and capture of Damascus in 634 or 635 as a lieutenant of Abu Ubayda ibn al-Jarrah. During the caliphate of Uthman (r. 644–656), he became a loyalist of Syria's governor Mu'awiya ibn Abi Sufyan. For a certain period, the latter appointed Sufyan ṣāḥib al-ṣawāʾif, i.e. chief commander of the summer expeditions into Byzantine territory in Anatolia, across the northern frontier.

During the First Fitna between Mu'awiya and Caliph Ali (r. 656–661), Sufyan led a raid against Ali's positions in Iraq in 659/660 or the summer of 660. Sufyan first reached Hit and Sandawda, both on the west bank of the Euphrates, and upon finding them deserted by their garrisons and inhabitants, who fled at the news of Sufyan's impending assault, he proceeded toward Anbar, on the east bank of the river. During the attack, the commander of the Anbar garrison, Ashras ibn Hassan al-Bakri, and thirty of his soldiers were slain. After looting the town, Sufyan withdrew to Syria without proceeding to al-Mada'in as instructed by Mu'awiya, who nonetheless praised him for the expedition's efficiency and success. He promised to install Sufyan to any office he wished. The attacks contributed to the flight of many Iraqis to Syria during the war.

Mu'awiya ultimately prevailed in the conflict and became caliph in 661. He restarted the campaigns against Byzantium after the lull caused by the civil war and in 665 appointed Sufyan alongside his own son Yazid to lead a summer raid against the Byzantines; Sufyan and his men entered Byzantine territory before Yazid, but shortly after withdrew as a result of disease. In the medieval Muslim accounts of al-Ya'qubi (d. c. 900) and al-Tabari (d. 923), Sufyan was a commander of a raid against Byzantine territory in 670/71. According to the Muslim traditional historians al-Waqidi (d. 822), Khalifa ibn Khayyat (d. 854), al-Ya'qubi and al-Tabari, Sufyan led an expedition against the Byzantines in 672, during which al-Waqidi and al-Ya'qubi state he died. According to the Syriac historian Theophilus of Edessa (d. 785), Sufyan was slain with 30,000 of his men by a Byzantine army led by the patricians Florus, Petronas and Cyprian in 673/74; Michael the Syrian (d. 1199) further notes that the location of the battle was at a Lycian coastal city under siege by the Arabs. The battle was a turning point at this stage of the Arab–Byzantine wars, setting the Byzantines up for a counter-offensive over the following several years. In the biography of Sufyan by Ibn Asakir (d. 1176), Sufyan is said to have been killed in Byzantine territory in 674.

== Bibliography ==
- Biesterfeldt, Hinrich; Günther, Sebastian (2018). The Works of Ibn Wāḍiḥ al-Yaʿqūbī (Volume 3): An English Translation. Leiden: Brill. ISBN 978-90-04-35621-4.
- Elad, Amikam (2003). "The Beginnings of Historical Writing by the Arabs: The Earliest Syrian Writers on the Arab Conquests". Jerusalem Studies in Arabic and Islam. 28: 65–102.
- Jankowiak, Marek (2013). "The First Arab Siege of Constantinople". In Zuckerman, Constantin (ed.). Travaux et mémoires, Vol. 17: Constructing the Seventh Century. Paris: Association des Amis du Centre d’Histoire et Civilisation de Byzance. pp. 237–320.
- Madelung, Wilferd (1997). The Succession to Muhammad: A Study of the Early Caliphate. Cambridge: Cambridge University Press. ISBN 0-521-56181-7.
- Ulrich, Brian John (2008), Constructing Al-Azd: Tribal Identity and Society in the Early Islamic Centuries, Madison: University of Wisconsin
