= Avar =

Avar(s) or AVAR may refer to:

== Peoples and states ==
- Avars (Caucasus), a modern Northeast Caucasian-speaking people in the North Caucasus, Dagestan, Russia
  - Avar language, the modern Northeast Caucasian language spoken by the Avars of the North Caucasus, Dagestan, Russia
  - Avar Khanate, a former country (13th century CE to 1864) of the Caucasus Avars
- Pannonian Avars, a medieval nomadic people of probable East Asian Steppe origin who roamed Eastern and Central Europe from the 6th to the 9th centuries CE
  - Avar Khaganate, a former country (567 to 822 CE) of the Pannonian Avars
- Rouran Khaganate, a state of nomadic Mongolian tribes from the late-4th century until the mid-6th century, possibly linked with the Pannonian Avars
- Avar (surname)

== Settlements in Iran ==
- Avar, Qazvin
- Avar, Razavi Khorasan
- Avar, Tehran

== In science and technology ==
- Avar (animation variable), a variable in computer-generated imagery
- Avar(), symbol for asymptotic variance, in statistics
- Allan variance, a statistical measure of frequency stability
- Trade name for dermatological drugs that contains a sulfonamide antibiotic
- Football abbreviation of assistant video assistant referee

== Other uses ==
- Average value at risk, a coherent risk measure in finance
- Avari (Middle-earth), a group of Elves in the Lord of the Rings fictional universe

== See also ==
- Eurasian Avars (disambiguation)
- Uar, a medieval Central Asian people also known as the Hephthalites, possibly linked with the Pannonian Avars
