= Adarga =

Moorish Berber shield

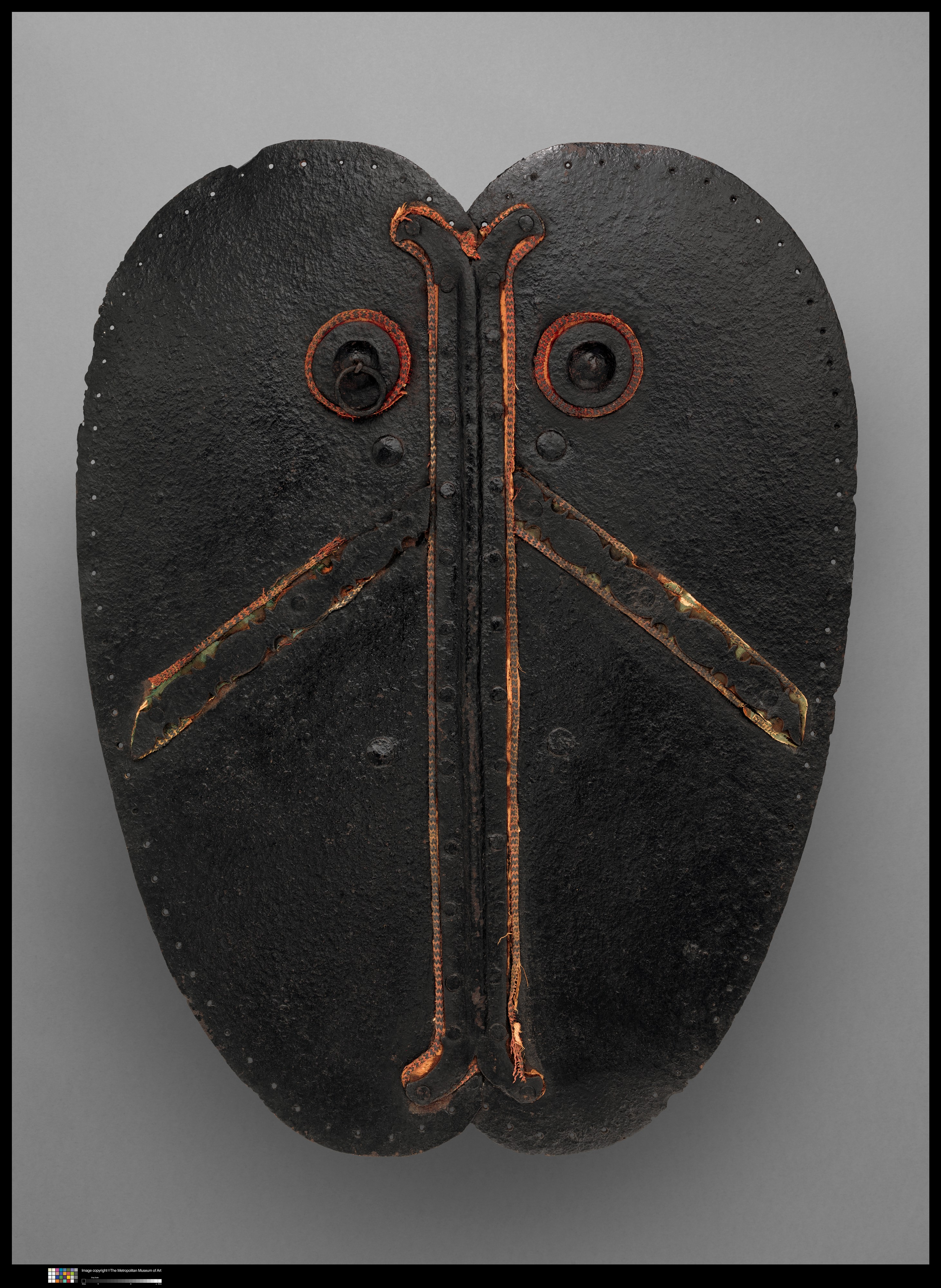
16th-century adarga at the Metropolitan Museum of Art

The adarga was a hard leather shield created by the North African Berbers, its name derived from the Berber "adarga" meaning "oryx". An important center of manufacture of the adarga was the city of Fes, Morocco. The adarga was typically made from the hide of the antelope (certainly the Scimitar Oryx) and was extremely resistant to the blows of sword, lance, javelin, and arrow, but other kinds of leather were used as well. Inside, in the center, was a pair of leather grips held in the hand or strapped to the forearm with a small cushion beneath to absorb impact. Originally the adarga was round, then heart-shaped, finally it took the form of a pair of overlapping ellipses or ovals, measuring 69–80 cm (27–31.5 in) in the long axis. Two or more layers of hide were glued and sewn together to make the adarga both rigid and elastic, and often decorated with incised and gilt ornaments, Moorish inscriptions, and metal appliques and borders.

The adarga was a traditional defense employed by the Moorish light horseman, who used it along with the lance. Throughout the 14th and 15th centuries, the adarga was also used by Christian Iberian soldiers and nobility, including their own light cavalry (Portuguese: ginetes; Spanish: jinetes), some of whom adopted Moorish fighting patterns. The adarga was in widespread use in Europe until the 16th century and the progression of firearms. The adarga was frequently used by the Conquistadores in the Americas and it continued to be used until the early 19th century by soldado de cuera in New Spain. These adargas were often decorated with the Spanish coat-of-arms.

Some impressive examples of the adarga are preserved in the Royal Armoury of the Royal Palace of Madrid, while one unique example is made from a large tortoise shell, taken at the Battle of Vienna in 1683 from the Turks, and is preserved in the armory of the Mons Clara Monastery at Częstochowa, Poland. The majority of surviving adargas are highly ornamental with painted decoration and were used by iberian nobles in tournament cavalry combat, particularly in the juego de las cañas (es) / jogo das canas (pt) ("game of canes"), a sport of the 16th and 17th centuries involving teams of horsemen who hurled javelins made of cane at one another that had to be dodged or deflected with the adarga, imitating past battles against the Moors.

== See also ==
- Rodeleros
