= Soldado de cuera =

Type of mounted soldiers serving northern New Spain

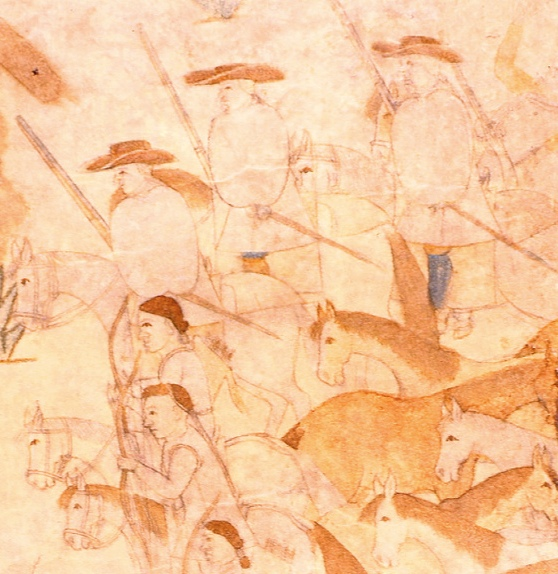
Soldados de cuera and Indian auxiliaries, 1720.

The soldados de cuera (English, "leather-jacket soldier") served in the frontier garrisons of northern New Spain, the Presidios, from the late 16th to the early 19th century. They were mounted and were an exclusive corps in the Spanish Empire. They took their name from the multi-layered deerskin cloaks they wore as protection against Indian arrows. When New Spain's visitador (inspector general) José de Gálvez organized the Portolá expedition, he was accompanied by a party of 25 soldiers, the "finest horsemen in the world, and among these soldiers who best earn their bread from the august monarch whom they serve".

== Equipment ==
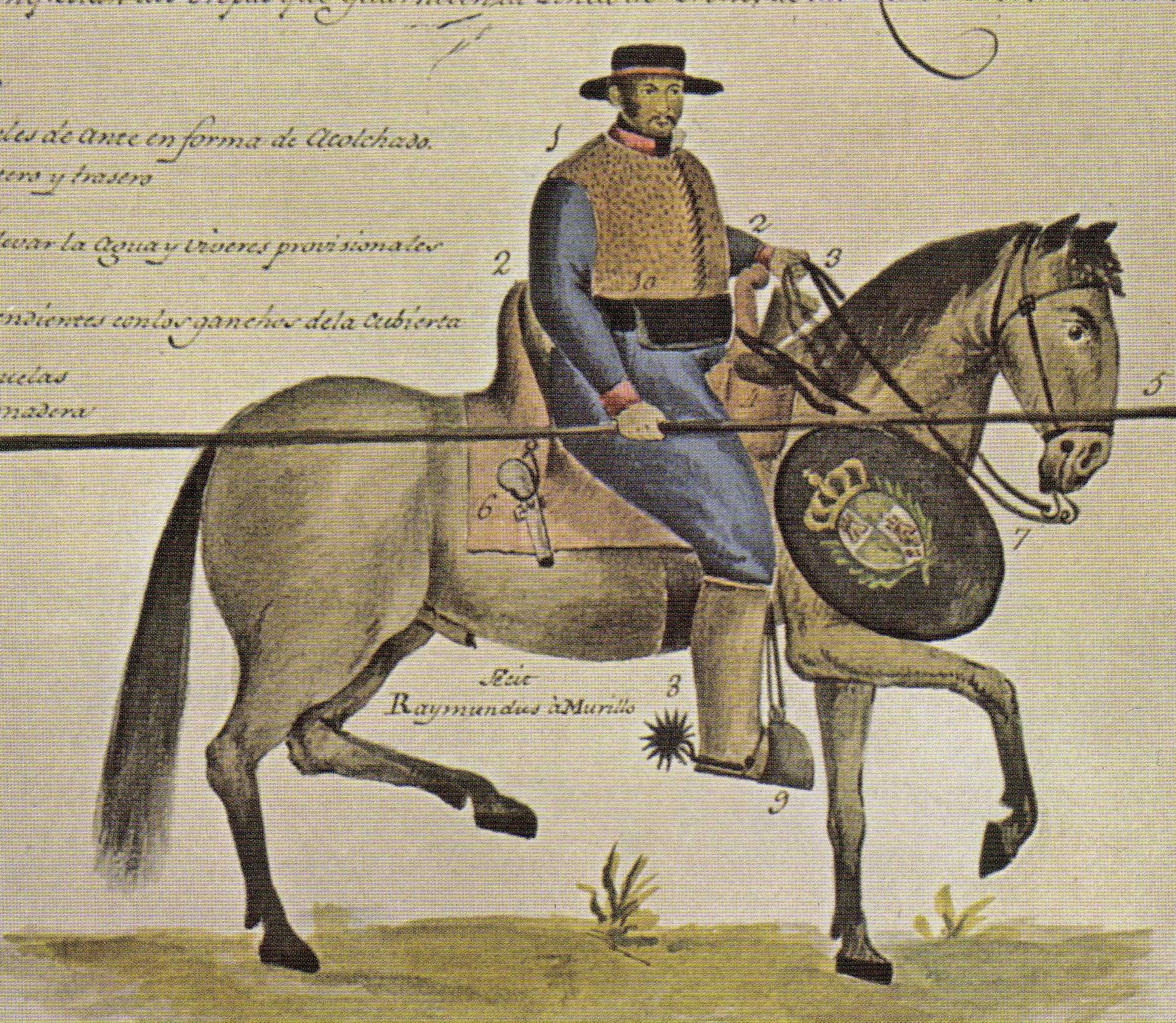
A soldados de cuera 1: Leather jacket with seven layers 2: Saddle pommel and cantle 3: Carbine 4: Saddle bag 5: Lance 6: Pistols hanging on each side of the fender 7: Buckler 8: Boots and spurs 9: Wooden stirrups 10: Cartridge box

"The cuera, which gave them their name, was a leather jacket, like a coat without sleeves, proof against the Indians' arrows except at very close range. For additional armor they had shields and chaps. The shields, carried on the left arm, were made of two plies of bull's hide, and would turn either arrow or spear. The leather chaps or aprons, fastened to the pommel of the saddle, protected legs and thighs from brush and cactus spines."

They were armed with a carbine (escopeta), pair of pistols (pistolas), bow (arco), dagger (puñal), sword (espada ancha), and lance (lanza). They also carried a bull-hide shield (adarga) or a small round metal shield (rodela) for defense against weapons such as swords, spears, javelins, and arrows. Each soldier had six horses, a foal, and a mule (until 1720 they had 10 horses). Equipment and animals belonged to the soldier personally and they had to pay for them out of their own purse.

== Recruitment ==
These frontier soldiers were recruited from among the Mestizo population and Hispanicized Native Americans. Most of the officers were Criollos and Mestizo, whereas very few of the enlisted men had this distinction. The soldados de cuera manned the presidios that stretched from Los Adaes, Louisiana, in the East, across Texas, New Mexico, and Arizona, to the Pacific Coast of Alta California in the West. There was no lack of volunteers for the service. Recruitment took place mainly among the local population, accustomed to the local climate, who were expert horsemen, and experienced trackers who knew the country. For the poor general population the service as a soldados de cuera was attractive, with many perks; regular pay, medical care, the possibility of land grants and promotions.

== Assignments ==
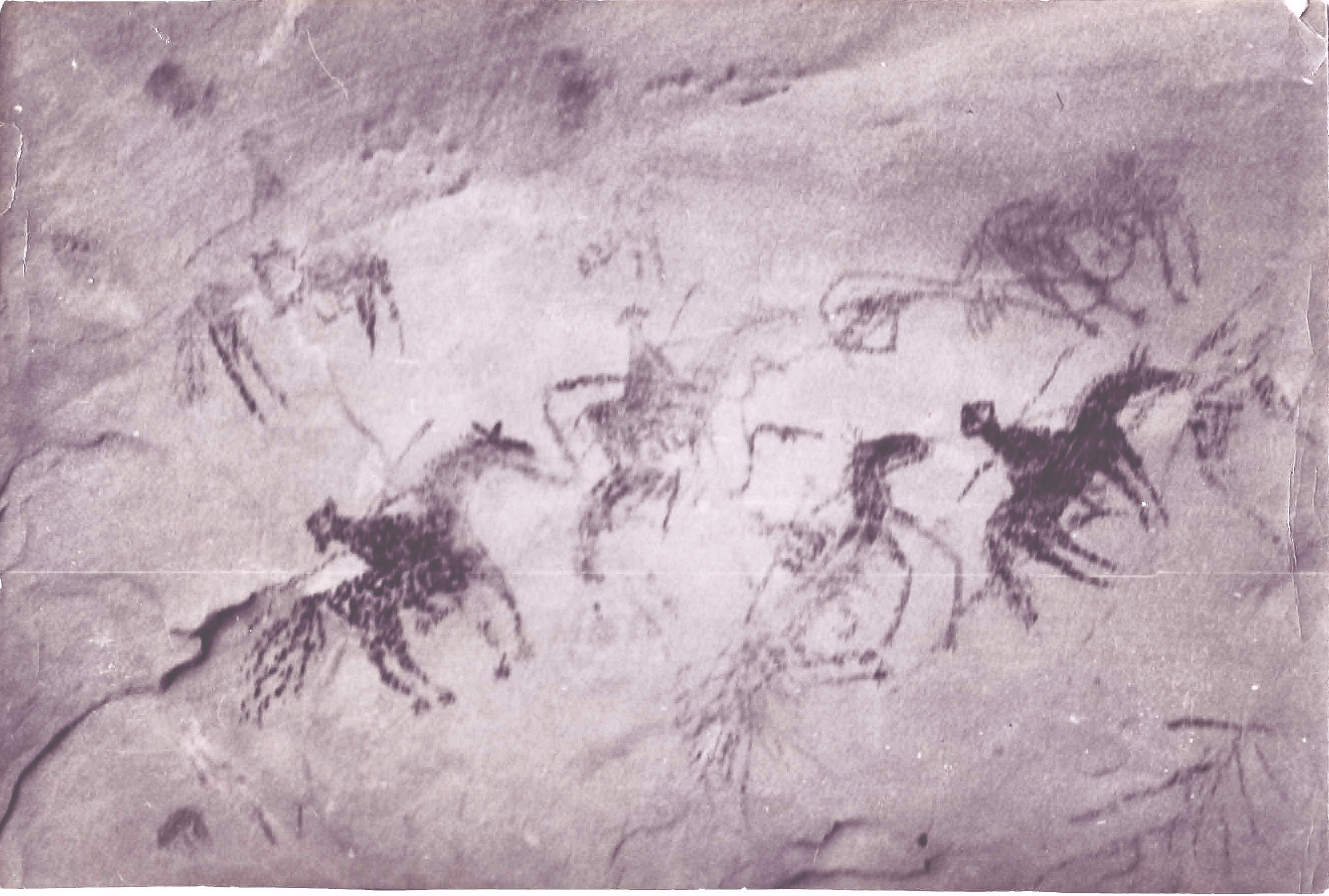
Possible Navajo charcoal cave drawing of soldados de cuera, date of drawing unknown

When not on campaign against hostile Indians, the soldados de cuera escorted convoys of travelers or merchandise. They also had to take care of watching the enormous remudas of the presidios from native horse thieves; a fifty man garrison had over 500 horses and mules. This constant vigilance reduced the number of men available for other missions.

== Villasur expedition ==
In August 1720 a detachment of about 40 soldados de cuera, accompanied by indigenous allies, undertook an exploratory incursion into what is now Nebraska. Ambushed by Pawnee and Otoe tribal groups the column was destroyed with only a few horseholders amongst the cuera soldiers escaping. This defeat marked the end of Spanish expansion eastwards into the Great Plains.

== Organization ==
In Santa Fe, the governor of Santa Fe de Nuevo México was the captain and commander of the company of dragones de cuera He normally held the rank of teniente coronel graduado, that is Lieutenant Colonel by brevet. In addition there were two lieutenants (the first lieutenant normally captain by brevet) with a pay of 700 pesos annually. There were also two sergeants with 350 pesos each; six corporals with 300 pesos each; and 69 privates with 290 pesos each. Among the privates were also an armorer, a drummer, and six carabineers.

The compañías volantes (flying companies) raised in 1767 were used as a mobile reserve, but had the same equipment as the normal companies. The tropas ligeras (light troops) raised in 1778, did not use the leather armor, the shield or the lance, but were otherwise equipped like normal soldados de cuera except their hats were white. The normal strength of the light troops were 19 per company. In Santa Fe they were commanded by a second ensign with 450 pesos annually in pay, and a second sergeant with 320 pesos; light dragoon privates received 216 pesos annually.

== Strength ==
=== 1701 ===
Presidio/Unit	Strength
Nueva Vizcaya
Casas Grandes	50
San Francisco de Conchos	50
San Pedro del Gallo	45
Nuestra Señora del Pasaje de Cuencame	45
Cerro Gordo	23
Field companies of Parral and Durango	45
Nuevo México
El Paso	50
Santa Fe	100
Sonora
Flying company	50
Nuevo León
Cerralvo	10
Caldereta	10
Coahuila
San Francisco	25
Other provinces
Sinaloa	41
Tamos	4
Santa Catalina de Tape Huames	9

=== 1717 ===
Presidio/Unit	Strength
Nuevo México	100
Sinaloa	43
Coahuila	25
Paso del Rio del Norte	49
Cerralvo, Calderita y León	20
Cuencalné	40
San Antonio Casas Grandes	50
Sonora	50
Conchos	50
Gallo	43
Pasaje	45
Cerro Gordo	23
Santa Catarina de Tepehuenes	9
Durango	15
Field company	30

=== 1764 ===
Presidios and their strength in the several provinces:

Texas

- Bahía del Espíritu Santo, 51
- Adaes, 61
- San Sabá, 101
- Trinidad, 31
- Bejar, 23
- Nuevo México
- Santa Fe, 81
- El Paso, 50

Nayarit

- Nayarit, 43

Nueva Vizcaya

Junta de los Ríos, 50 Janos, 51 Guajoquilla, 51

Coahuila

Rio Grande. 33 San Francisco de Coahuila. 36 Santa Rosa del Sacramento. 52

Nuevo León

San Agustín Ahumada, 27

Sonora

Corodeguachi, 51 Guebavi, 51 Horcasitas, 51 Tubac, 51 Caborca (Altar), 51 Buenavista, 51

California

Loreto, 30 San José del Cabo, 30

Nuevo Santander

- Santa Ana Calnargo, 13
- Villa de San Fernando, 10
- Villa de San Antonio Padilla, 5
- Nuestra Señora De Loreto de Burgos, 12
- Santa Maria de Llera, 12
- San Francisco de Güemes, 8
- San Juan Bautista Horcasitas, 11
- Dulce Nombre de Jesús Escandan, 9
- Soto la Marina, 11
- Cinco Señores de Santander, 22
- Reinosa, 11
- Santa Maria de Aguayo, 1
- San Antonio Padilla, 12

== See also ==
- Army of Arauco
