= Company A, Arizona Rangers =

Confederate military unit of the American Civil War

- Active: 1862–1865
- Country: Confederate States
- Allegiance: Arizona Territory
- Branch: Confederate States Army
- Type: Cavalry
- Size: Company
- Part of: Herbert's Battalion, Arizona Cavalry
- Engagements: American Civil War: Battle of Mesilla (1861); Capture of Tucson (1862); First Battle of Dragoon Springs; Second Battle of Dragoon Springs; Battle of Fort Bisland

Commanders
- Notable commanders: Capt. Sherod Hunter; Capt. Granville Oury

The Company A, Arizona Rangers (also known as "Oury's Company, Herbert's Battalion, Arizona Cavalry") was a cavalry formation of the Confederate States Army during the American Civil War.

== Origin of the Arizona Rangers ==
After the establishment of the Confederate Arizona Territory, Governor John Robert Baylor decided he needed to supplement existing militia companies with a regiment of Rangers like the Texas Rangers. He intended this regiment would consist of several companies of cavalry. On January 25, 1862, its first company, Company A, Baylor's Regiment of Arizona Rangers commanded by Captain Sherod Hunter, was mustered into the Confederate service at the town of Dona Ana located just north of modern Las Cruces, New Mexico.

Hunter's Company consisted of about 75 men for the most part residents of the Confederate Territory of Arizona. They were armed with revolvers and Model 1847 smoothbore musketoons, probably taken from Fort Fillmore after it surrendered in August 1861. The company was enlisted for three years, or the duration of the war. They were picked for their skills and experience with the hardships of frontier life. Many were former members of the three local Arizona Militia companies from Pinos Altos and Messila.

== Arizona Campaign against the California Column ==
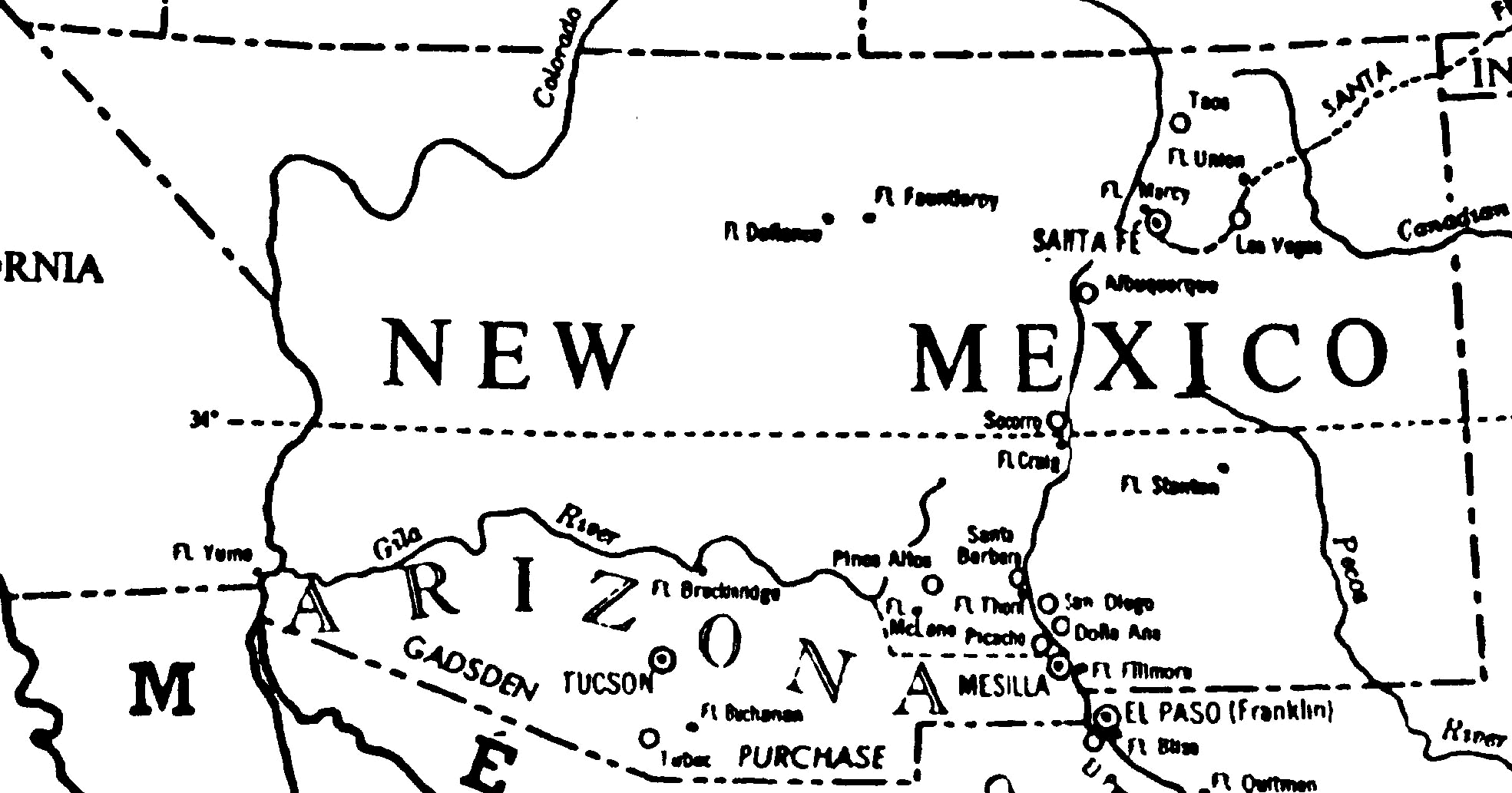
Confederate Arizona and New Mexico Territories

On February 10, 1862 Company A was ordered to occupy Tucson, the largest town in the western Confederate Territory of Arizona. Tucson was located on the Butterfield Overland Mail road, the only one between California and the Rio Grande and Mesilla valleys, and an ideal location for an advanced post to observe and delay the advance of Union forces gathering under Col. James Henry Carleton at Fort Yuma. By taking possession of Tucson, Baylor would also protect the citizens and secure the Confederate claim to possession of western Arizona, which had been abandoned by Union troops in 1861.

Company A arrived in Tucson on February 28, with the loss of only one life; Corporal Benjamin Mayo who had died of exposure at San Simon Stage Station on the 25th. The invasion of Arizona by the California Column would have come much sooner but for the tactics of Captain Hunter and Company A. At White's Mill, near the Pima Villages, about twenty miles south of present Phoenix, Captain Hunter captured without firing a shot, a scouting party of nine men of Company A, 1st Regiment California Volunteer Cavalry under Captain William McCleave. Following their surprise of McCleave they destroyed caches of hay stored at the Butterfield stage stations along the barren route from Fort Yuma to the Gila River. At the villages of the Pima Indians on the Gila River, (about 30 miles south of present-day Phoenix, Arizona), Hunter also discovered 1,500 sacks of flour from wheat purchased from the Pima by federal purchase agent Ammi M. White. It had been ground into flour and stored in his mill in anticipation of the advance of the Union forces. Hunter's men arrested White, disabled the mill and confiscated the flour. However, because of insufficient transport Hunter could not remove the flour, so Sherod gave it back to the Pima for them to use.

When news of the capture of McCleave got back to Fort Yuma, a larger force under Captain William Calloway was sent along the same route with orders to find and free Captain McCleave and his men. Calloway's force clashed with elements of Company A burning hay at Stanwix Station and after a brief skirmish, the Arizona Rangers retreated to Tucson. Afterward Calloway reached the Pima Villages, the main supply point between Fort Yuma and Tucson and after a short rest, set out toward Tucson. As they approached Picacho Pass, Indian scouts brought in information that Confederate pickets were just ahead. Lieutenant James Barrett and a small group of his Company A, First Cavalry were ordered to make a wide detour to strike them on the flank, while Calloway would make a frontal attack with the main party. In the following Battle of Picacho Pass the Barret's California cavalry engaged alone and suffered defeat in a brisk engagement. The Confederates watched the California cavalry retreat, then they fell back to Tucson, to warn Tucson's garrison of the approaching Union army.

Captain Calloway returned to the Pima Villages and started work on a permanent camp, throwing up earth works around the flour mill of Ammi White, who had been taken away with McCleve to Mesilla by the rebels a few weeks before. This earth work was named "Fort Barrett" in honor of their comrade killed at Picacho Pass.

Confiscation of the wheat and burning of hay now forced a halt at the villages while new supplies were gathered. It required several weeks for the main elements of the "Column" to get to Pima Villages, due to the time needed to gather more hay along the route. Further delay occurred because only detachments of less than four companies could move over the desert routes within twenty-four hours of each other, due to the scarcity of water. The net effect of the Arizona Rangers' actions was to delay the advance of the California Column for over a month, which probably saved the Confederate Army of New Mexico, now retreating back to Mesilla from its defeat at the Battle of Glorieta Pass, from being intercepted and destroyed by the California Column during April 1862.

After the battle at Picacho Pass, Captain Hunter wrote to Governor Baylor, requesting a reinforcement of at least 250 men, with which he felt he could hold Tucson. When no reinforcements were forthcoming, Hunter decided to evacuate Tucson. Company A left Tucson on May 14, leaving behind a small detachment under the command of Lieutenant James Henry Tevis to watch for the approach of Union forces.

Unknown to the Confederates, on that same day, the Union California Column finally left its bivouac at the Pima Villages for its final advance on Tucson. On May 15, Colonel West and his advance California detachment moved out of the Pima Villages for Tucson, going through Rattlesnake Springs to old Fort Breckenridge, and camped that night in the "Canyon de Oro". The next day, May 19, a short march of fifteen miles was made, and the party camped within ten miles of Tucson. Early on the morning of the 20th, the command moved forward until it arrived within two miles of the town. Captain Emil Fritz, Company B, 1st Cavalry, was ordered take his first platoon to make a detour and come in on the east side of the town; the second platoon, under Juan Francisco Guirado, was to charge in on the north side, while the four companies of infantry were to come in on the road from the west. Lieutenant Tevis and his detachment were surprised and almost captured when the Yankee cavalry charged into town on May 20. The three California columns arrived at the plaza at the same moment, the cavalry at the charge and the infantry at the double quick, but found no enemy. Tevis and his men had managed to escape, and rejoined the main body of Company A a few days later.

During the retreat to Messilla, Company A clashed twice with the Apache. First, in the First Battle of Dragoon Springs, where four of its soldiers were killed and some of its stock were lost. In the Second Battle of Dragoon Springs they had the best of the encounter.

== With the Army of New Mexico and the Sibley Brigade ==
After Hunter's Company A retreated from Tucson and arrived in Mesilla on May 27, 1862, it was organized with two Arizona militia companies, the Arizona Guards of Pinos Altos and the Arizona Rangers of Mesilla, under Herbert's Battalion of Arizona Cavalry under the command of Lt. Colonel Philemon T. Herbert. It served as rearguard to the remnants of the Army of New Mexico as it withdrew from El Paso to San Antonio, in July 1862.

After their arrival in San Antonio, Herbert's Battalion was formally assigned to the "Sibley Brigade", the name given the former Army of New Mexico. Colonel Thomas Green was in command in place of Brigadier General Henry Hopkins Sibley, who was away in Richmond until December, 1862. On October 2, 1862, Sherod Hunter was promoted major and joined Second Cavalry Regiment, Arizona Brigade under Colonel George Wythe Baylor. First Lieutenant Robert L. Swope, was promoted to captain and assumed command of the Company A.

On December 2, 1862, General Sibley was ordered to New Iberia, Louisiana, to take over command of his Brigade. On December 25 he found that most of the brigade had been ordered to Galveston, but Herbert's Battalion was there in Louisiana actively scouting in the vicinity of Plaquemine and the Mississippi River. In February 1863, shortly after the arrival of the Sibley Brigade in Louisiana, Captain Robert L. Swope resigned as commander of Company A. First Lieutenant James Henry Tevis took command, but was not promoted to the rank of captain at the time.

In April 1863, the Sibley Brigade including Herbert's Arizona Battalion was among the men with which General Taylor confronted the Yankee army under General Nathaniel Banks at Fort Bisland, on the Bayou Teche. The Battle of Fort Bisland was a defeat for the Confederates, and General Taylor ordered a retreat. General Sibley, in command of the rear guard, nearly lost his command at Franklin, Louisiana, when he ordered the last bridge across the Bayou burned before his men had made their escape. Fortunately for them, they saw the flames behind them and quickly disengaged and fled across the bridge before it was fully engulfed in flames. Sibley was court-martialed for this and removed from command of the Brigade. Colonel Thomas Green, who had led the brigade, was promoted to Brigadier General and placed in command of the Brigade.

== Arizona Scout Company in Arkansas, Louisiana, Texas ==
By the end of May 1863 the Arizona Battalion had been reduced by losses and it was broken up. Company A still had enough men to continue as a viable company, and was kept in being but renamed as the independent Arizona Scout Company, attached to Green's Brigade. The other two companies of the Battalion were disbanded and the men consolidated with those of Company A to form the Arizona Scout Company.

In June 1863 the Scouts participated in the Bayou Teche Campaign. The surrender of the Confederate bastion at Port Hudson, Louisiana in July 1863 led to the retreat of Green's Brigade to the region of Shreveport, Louisiana. In November 1863, the Arizona Scouts fought with Green's Brigade against a Union invasion up the Bayou Teche. In early December 1863 the brigade was recalled to Texas, in response to a threatened assault on Galveston which never materialized.

In late December 1863, while near Galveston, the Second and Third Texas–Arizona Cavalry Regiments were reassigned to the Texas Cavalry Brigade commanded by Brigadier General James Patrick Major and the Scouts were assigned to that brigade also, However, in February 1864, the Arizona Scouts were among the companies detached from Texas Cavalry Brigade to form a Scouting Battalion under the command of Major William Saufley. Captain Tevis's Arizona Scout Company became Company E of the Battalion. During January and February 1864 the company operated as part of a command under Colonel James Duff 33rd Texas Cavalry near Indianola, Texas.

During the Red River Campaign, the Arizona Scouts again fought as part of Major's Texas Cavalry Brigade which was combined with Green's Brigade, and a brigade of Louisiana regiments to form a Cavalry Division under Major General Tom Green. The Arizona Scouts fought in the major battles at Wilson's Farm (April 7, 1864), Mansfield and Pleasant Hill, and in numerous other skirmishes throughout the campaign. On May 1, 1864 the Arizona Scouts under Lt. John M. Smith assisted in the capture Union transport, the U.S.S. Emma near Wilson’s Landing on the Red River. Captain Tevis wounded earlier in the campaign, served under the command of First Lieutenant John M. Smith for the rest of the campaign.

After the Red River Campaign, the Texas Cavalry Division, under Major General John A. Wharton, was among the units ordered northward into Arkansas. Arizona Scouts, went with them and for the rest of 1864 fought minor skirmishes and conducted routine picket duty and scouting. In November 1864, Captain Tevis (who by that time had recovered from his wounds) returned to command of the Arizona Scouts until General Edmund Kirby Smith, surrendered all Confederate forces west of the Mississippi River on May 26, 1865.

== See also ==
- List of Arizona Territory Civil War units

== Sources ==
- L. Boyd Finch, "Sherod Hunter and the Confederates in Arizona," Journal of Arizona History, Spring 1969.
- L. Boyd Finch, "The Civil War in Arizona: The Confederates Occupy Tucson," Arizona Highways, January 1989.
- L. Boyd Finch, "Arizona in Exile: Confederate Schemes to Recapture the Southwest," Journal of Arizona History, Spring 1992.
- L. Boyd Finch, Confederate Pathway to the Pacific: Major Sherod Hunter and Arizona Territory, C.S.A., Tucson, Arizona: Arizona Historical Society, 1996.
- Calvin P. Horn and William S. Wallace, Confederate Victories in the Southwest, Albuquerque, New Mexico: Horn and Wallace, 1961.
- Martin Hardwick Hall, The Confederate Army of New Mexico, Austin, Texas: Presidial Press, 1978.
- The California Military Museum; The California Column
