= List of Arizona Territory units in the American Civil War =

Citizens of the sparsely populated deserts of what would become the Arizona territory sided with the Confederacy in the Civil War. In 1861, pioneers at a convention in Tucson declared Arizona Confederate country, later electing Granville H. Oury as delegate to the Southern Congress. Around the same time, the southern part of the vast New Mexico Territory officially joined the Confederacy. In 1861, Lieutenant Colonel John Baylor recognized the Arizona Territory and established a provisional Confederate government with Mesilla as the capital.

On January 18 1862, the Arizona Territory was officially organized by the Confederate States of America. Two militia companies organized under the Confederate territorial government. Governor Baylor later gathered soldiers in his own regiments to form an Arizona Ranger Company, one of three planned. Only one, Company A, Arizona Rangers was formed before the Confederacy lost control of the territory in 1862.

All these units were then formed into Herbert's Battalion of Arizona Cavalry. They went on to fight together in this unit until May 1863 when the Arizona Battalion had been reduced by losses and it was broken up. Company A still had enough men to continue as a viable company, and was kept in being but renamed as the independent Arizona Scout Company. The other two companies of the Battalion were disbanded and the men consolidated with those of Company A to form the Arizona Scout Company that fought until the end of the war.

- Herbert's Battalion of Arizona Cavalry
  - Company A, Arizona Rangers
  - Arizona Guards of Pinos Altos mining camp, Arizona territorial militia company
  - Minute Men of Pinos Altos mining camp, Arizona Territorial militia company
  - Arizona Rangers of Mesilla, Arizona Territorial militia company
- Arizona Scout Company
- Sherod Hunter's militia

== See also ==
- Lists of American Civil War Regiments by State
- 1st Texas Cavalry Regiment (Arizona Brigade)
