= Adamsville A.O.U.W. Cemetery =

Cemetery in Pinal County, Arizona

Adamsville Cemetery
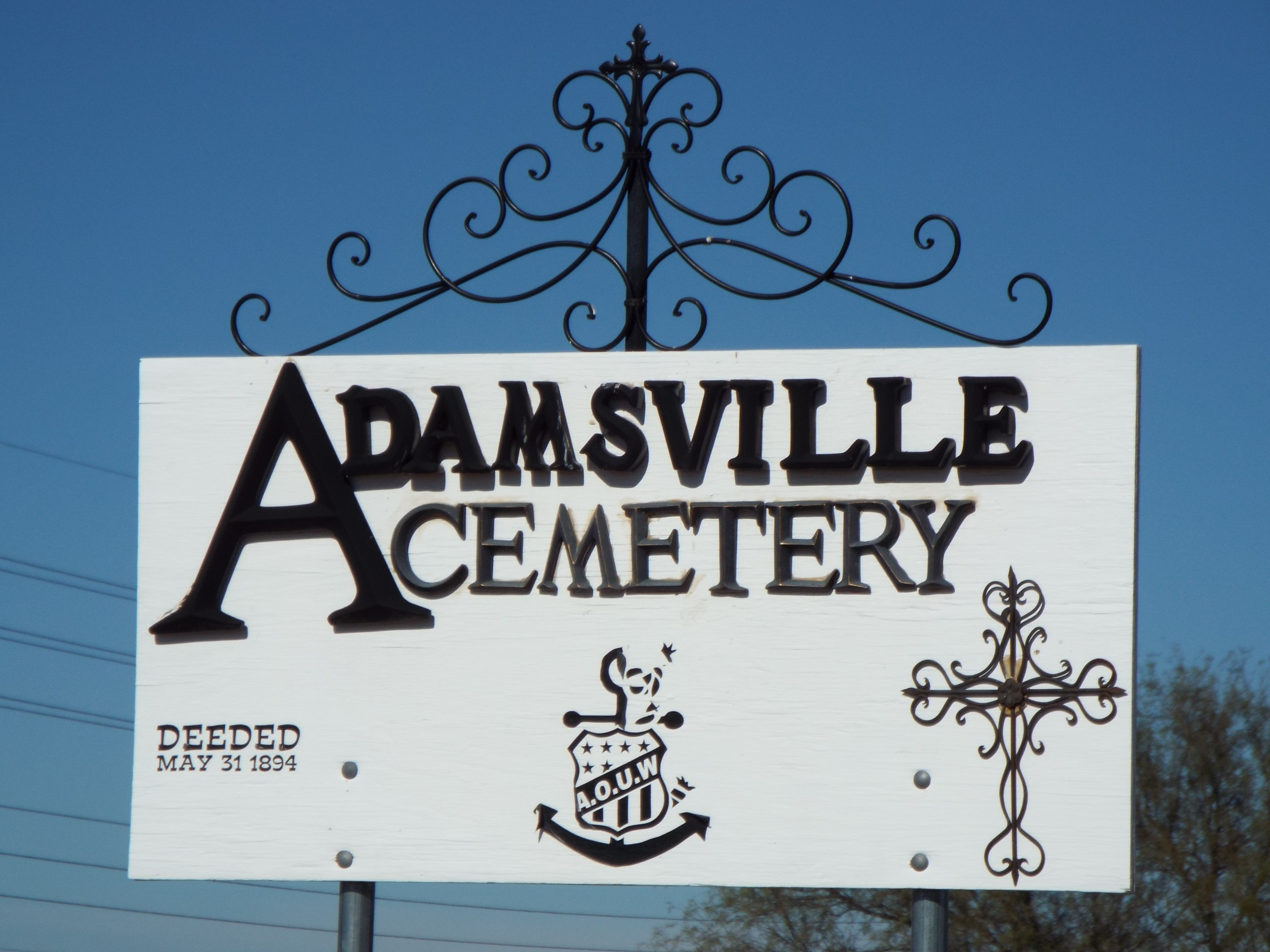

Details
- Established: May 31, 1894
- Location: Highway 79 and 287 on Adamsville Road, Pinal County, Arizona
- Country: U.S.
- Coordinates: 33°01′26″N 111°24′31″W
- Owned by: Florence, Arizona
- No. of graves: 54 identified
- No. of interments: 66
- Find a Grave: Adamsville Cemetery

The Adamsville Cemetery is a historic cemetery, established by the Ancient Order of United Workmen (A.O.U.W.) in Adamsville, a ghost town in Pinal County, Arizona. The Pioneers' Cemetery Association (PCA) defines a "historic cemetery" as one which has been in existence for more than fifty years.

== History ==
Adamsville was one of the first two towns formed in Pinal County, Arizona. The town was located at an elevation is 1,450 feet, on the south bank of the Gila River, west of Florence, Arizona. It was named for its original settler in 1866, Fred A. Adams. In 1900 the Gila River overflowed and wiped out most of the town. Those who survived the flood moved to the town of Florence. The remaining Adamsville A.O.U.W. Cemetery (Ancient Order of United Workmen) was deeded on May 31, 1894, to Florence. It is among the few original remains of the town of Adamsville.

In 1996, V. Phil Hawkins, cleaned, repaired, and identified graves in the cemetery as part of his Eagle Scout Service Project. Hawkins was able to identify the graves of 54 of those who are interred in the cemetery.

== Notable burials ==
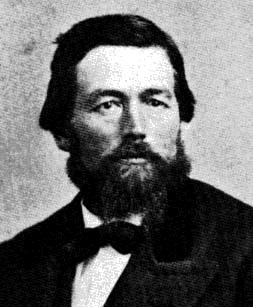
Grandville Henderson Oury

Among those interred in the cemetery and whose graves are pictured are:

- Fred A. Adams – Founder of Adamsville.
- Felix Grunde and his wife Martha Angeline Hardwick – Family known as the Hardwick pioneers. On December 23, 1883, Felix received $500 from the Arizona Territorial Legislature for the first bale of commercial cotton raised in Arizona. The bale was exhibited at the New Orleans Fair of 1884.
- Capt. Granville Henderson Oury – Judge: District court of New Mexico. Delegate to Confederate Congress. Arizona Mounted Volunteers CSA, Territorial legislator to U. S Congress, Pioneer-Soldier-Statesman.
- The Stevens family – Olnorah Nora Stevens, first wife of Daniel C. Stevens; Carmen Sarah Stevens, daughter of Daniel C. & Ollie (Olnorah) N. Stevens and Taylor Stevens, infant son of Daniel C. and Mary E. Stevens. Daniel C. Stevens had served as Clerk of the United States District Court of the second judicial district of Arizona and Secretary of the Arizona Consolidated Stage & Livery Company.
- Judge H. B. Summers – Summers had also served as a Pinal County District Attorney.

== Image gallery ==
Adamsville Cemetery gallery

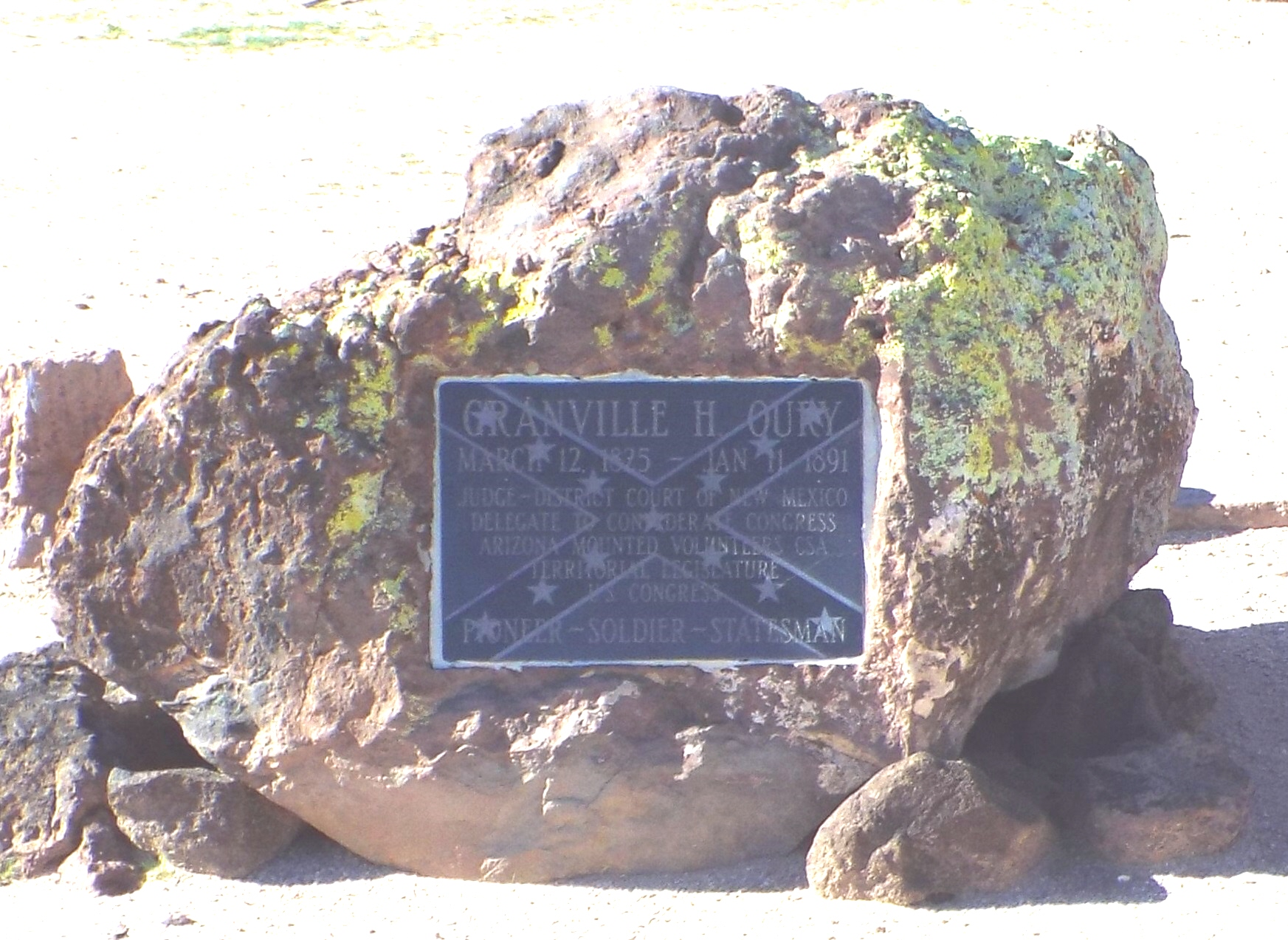
Monument dedicated to Capt. Granville H. Oruy

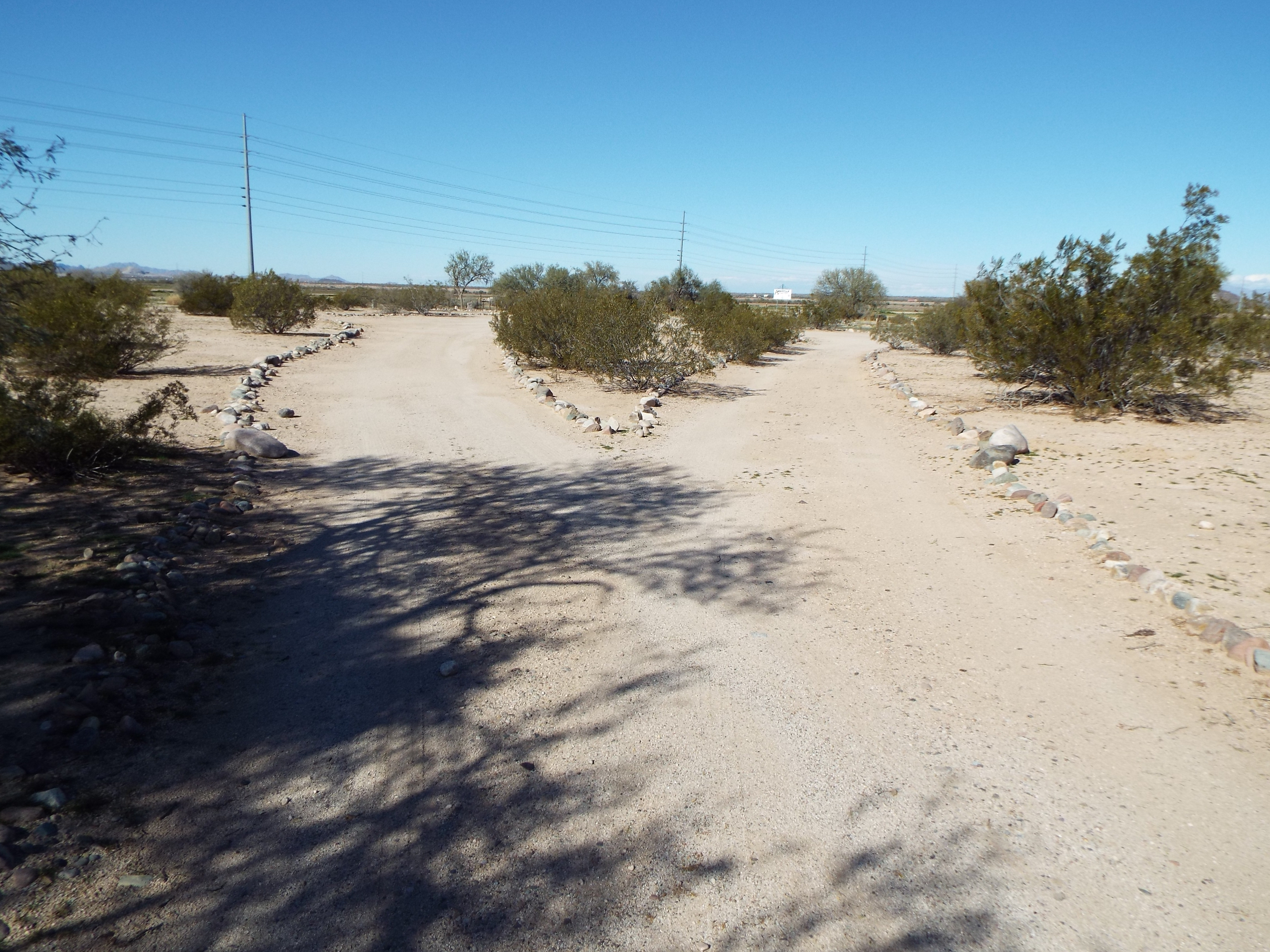
Cemetery trail

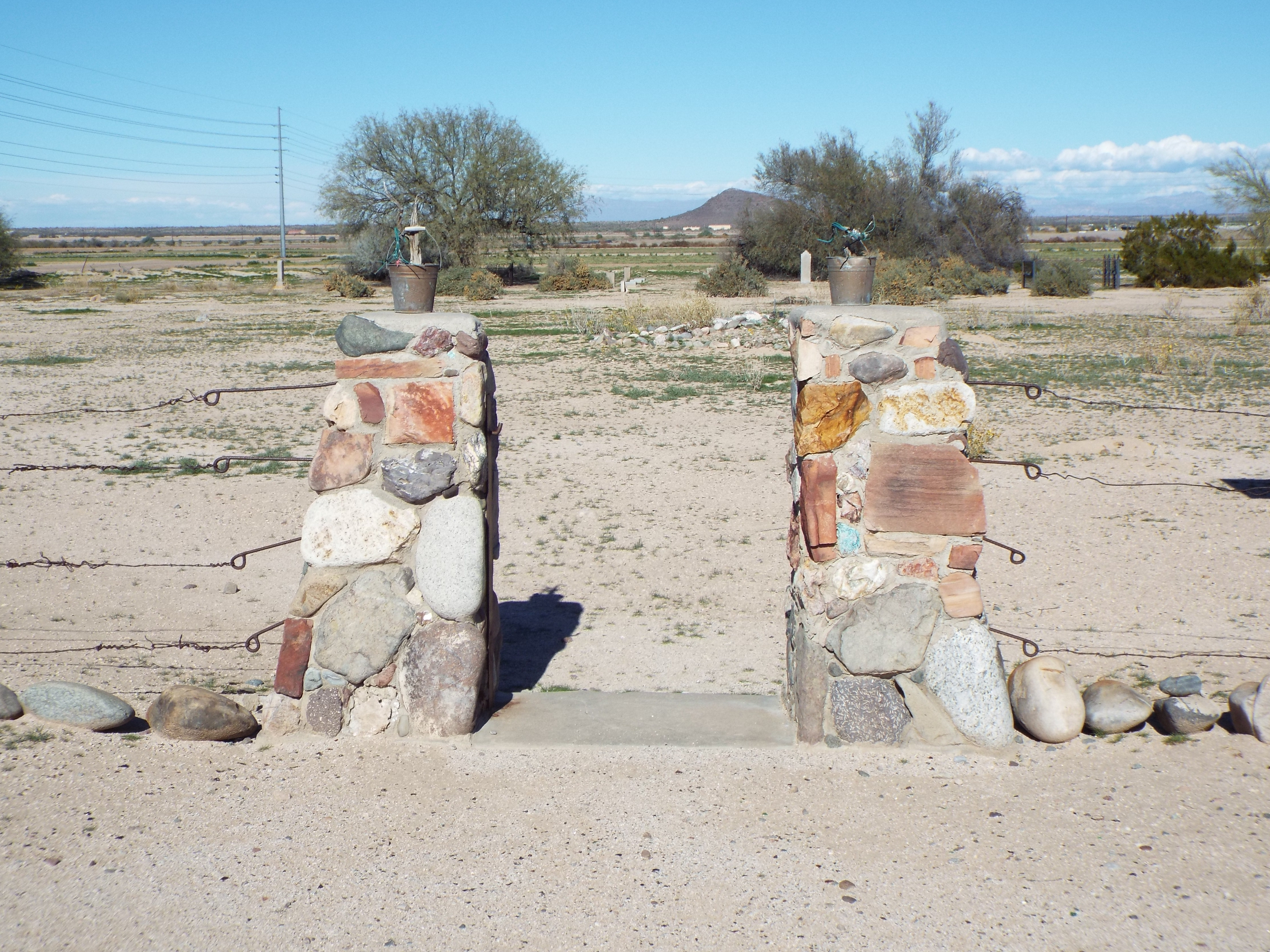
Entrance

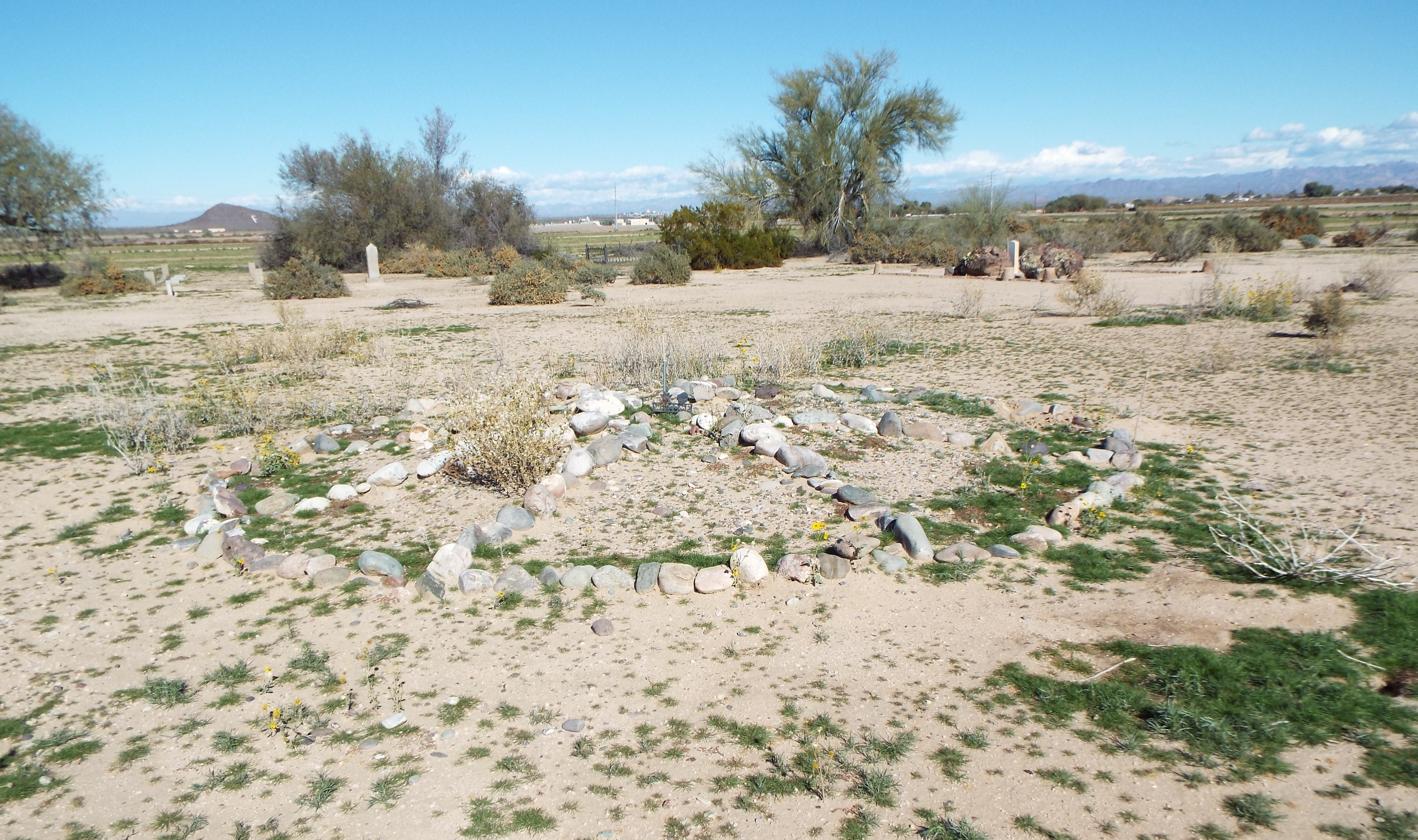
Rock formation in the middle of the cemetery

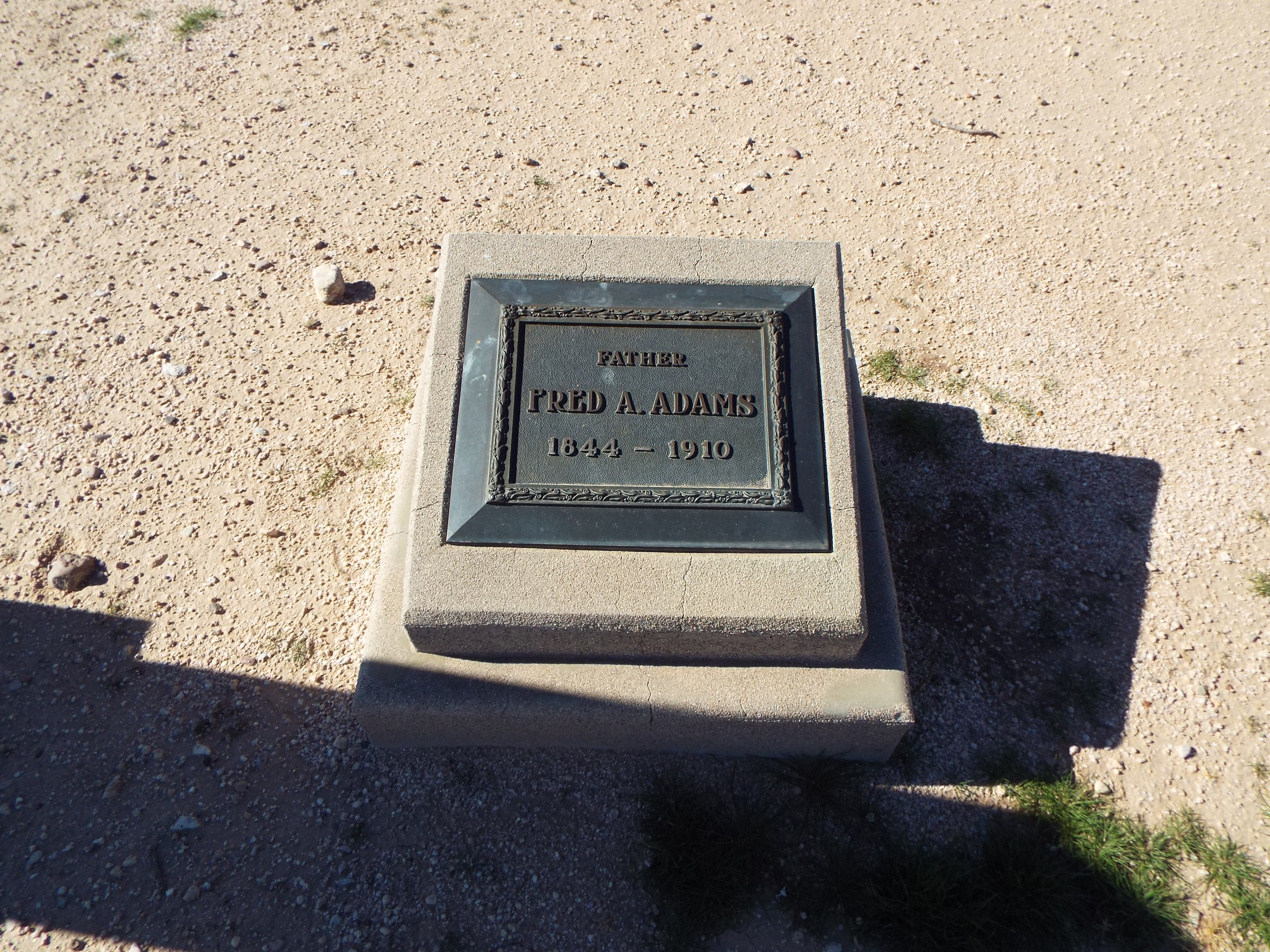
Grave of Fred A. Adams (1844–1910)

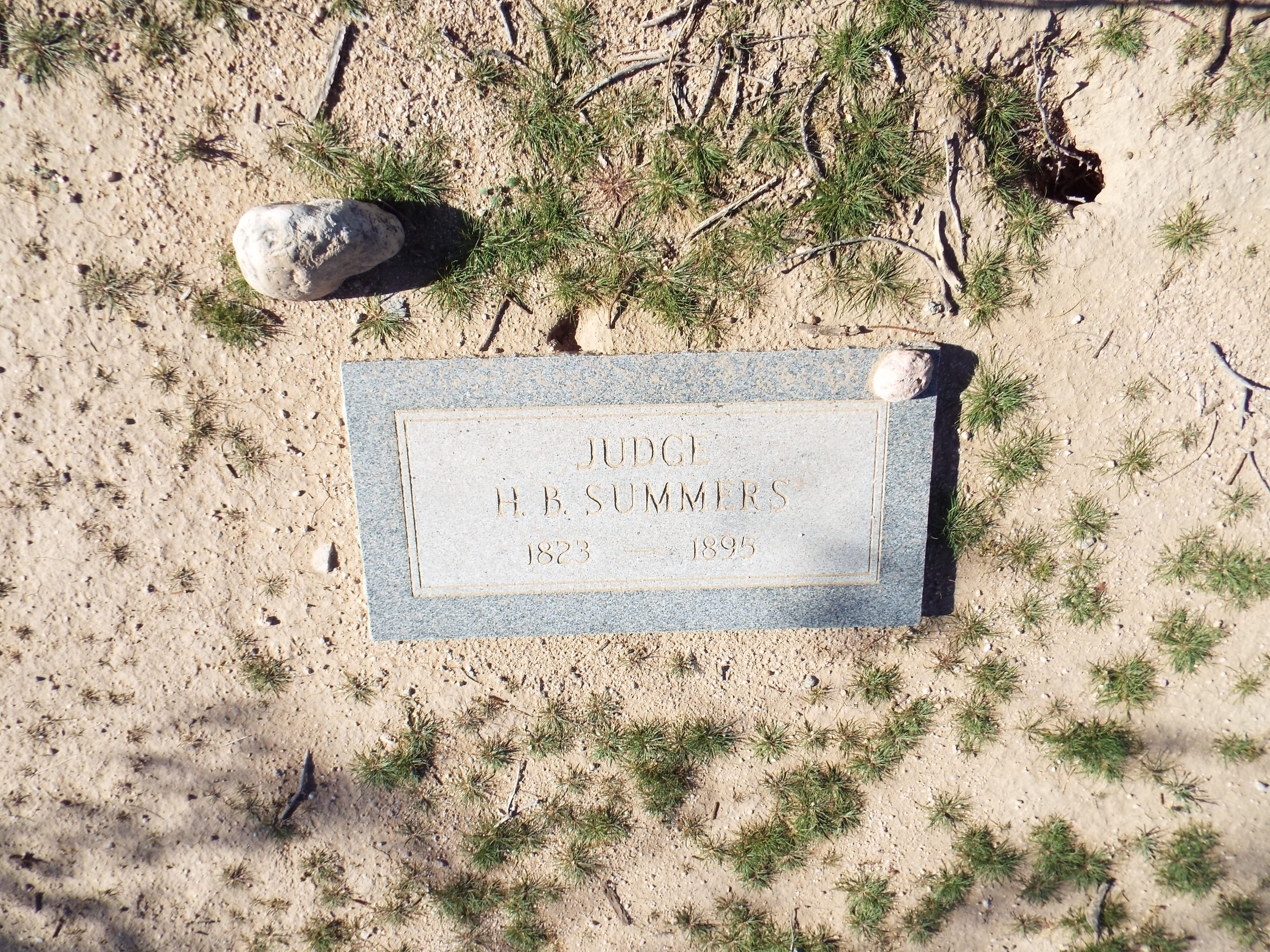
Grave of Judge H. B. Summers (1823–1895)

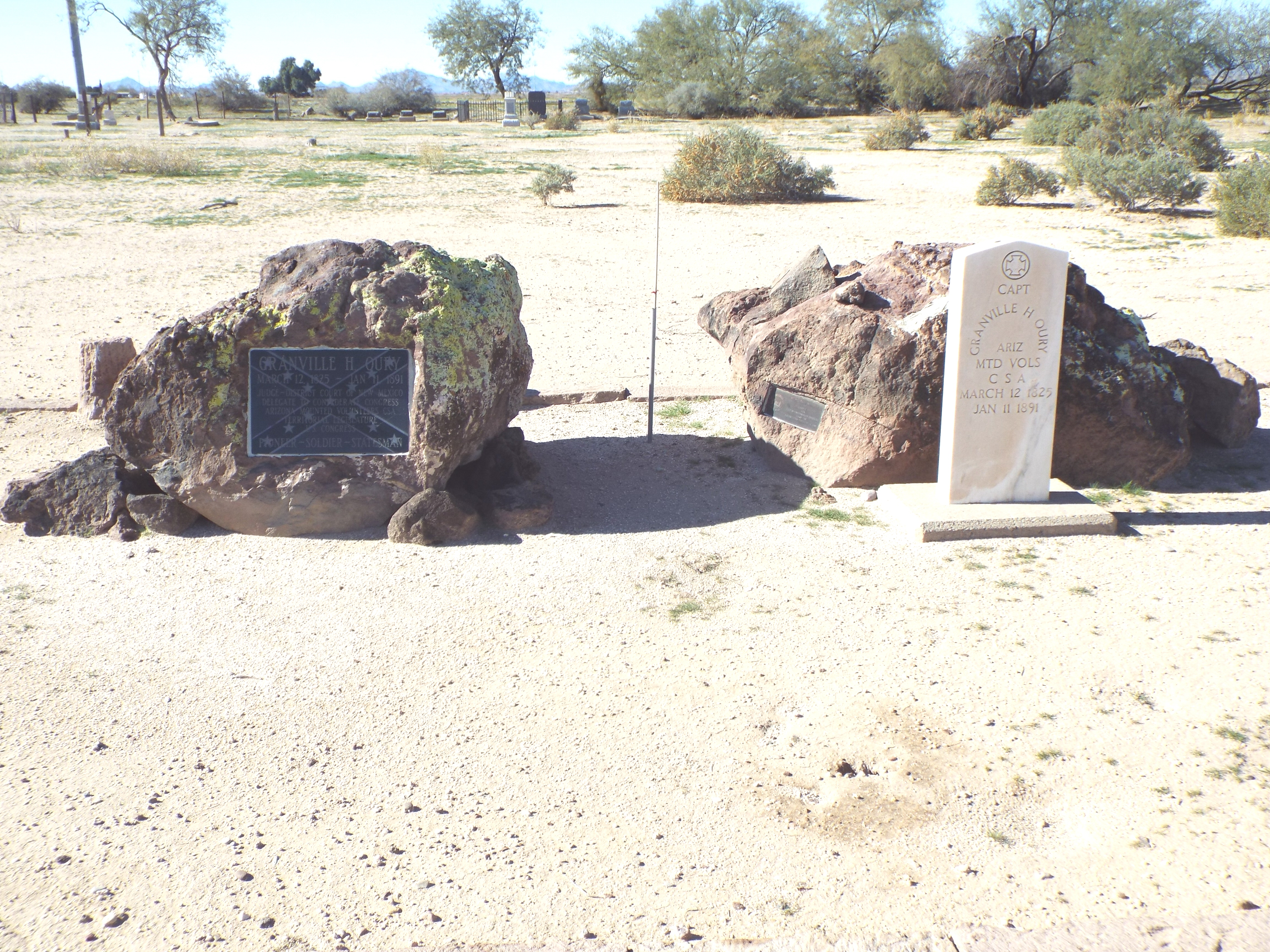
Grave of Capt. Granville Henderson Oury (1825–1891)

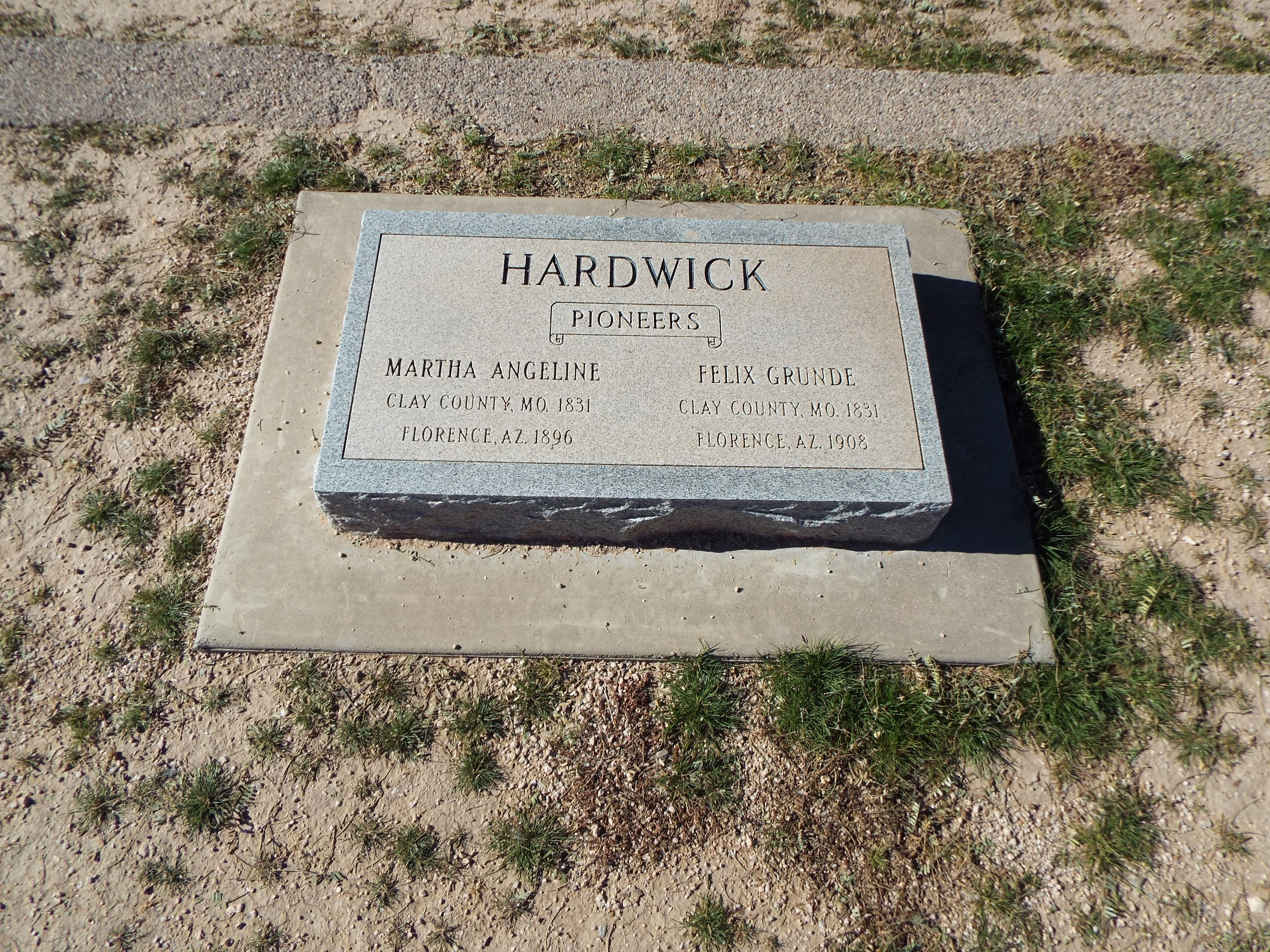
Graves of Felix Grunde Hardwick (1831–1908) and his wife Martha Angeline Hardwick (1831–1896)

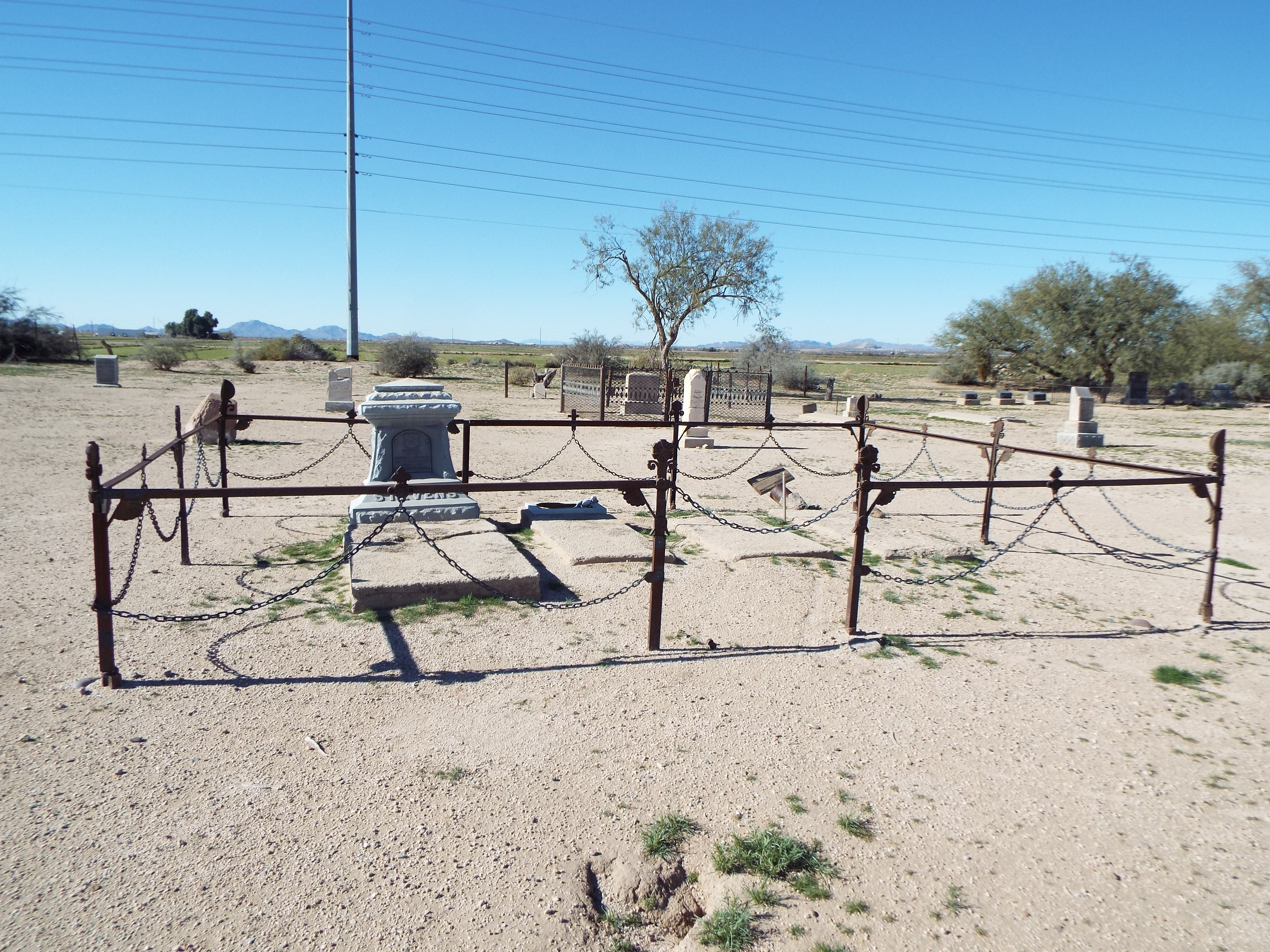
The Stevens family: Olnorah Stevens (1858–1893); Carmen Sarah Stevens (1888–1889) and Taylor Stevens (1898–1898)

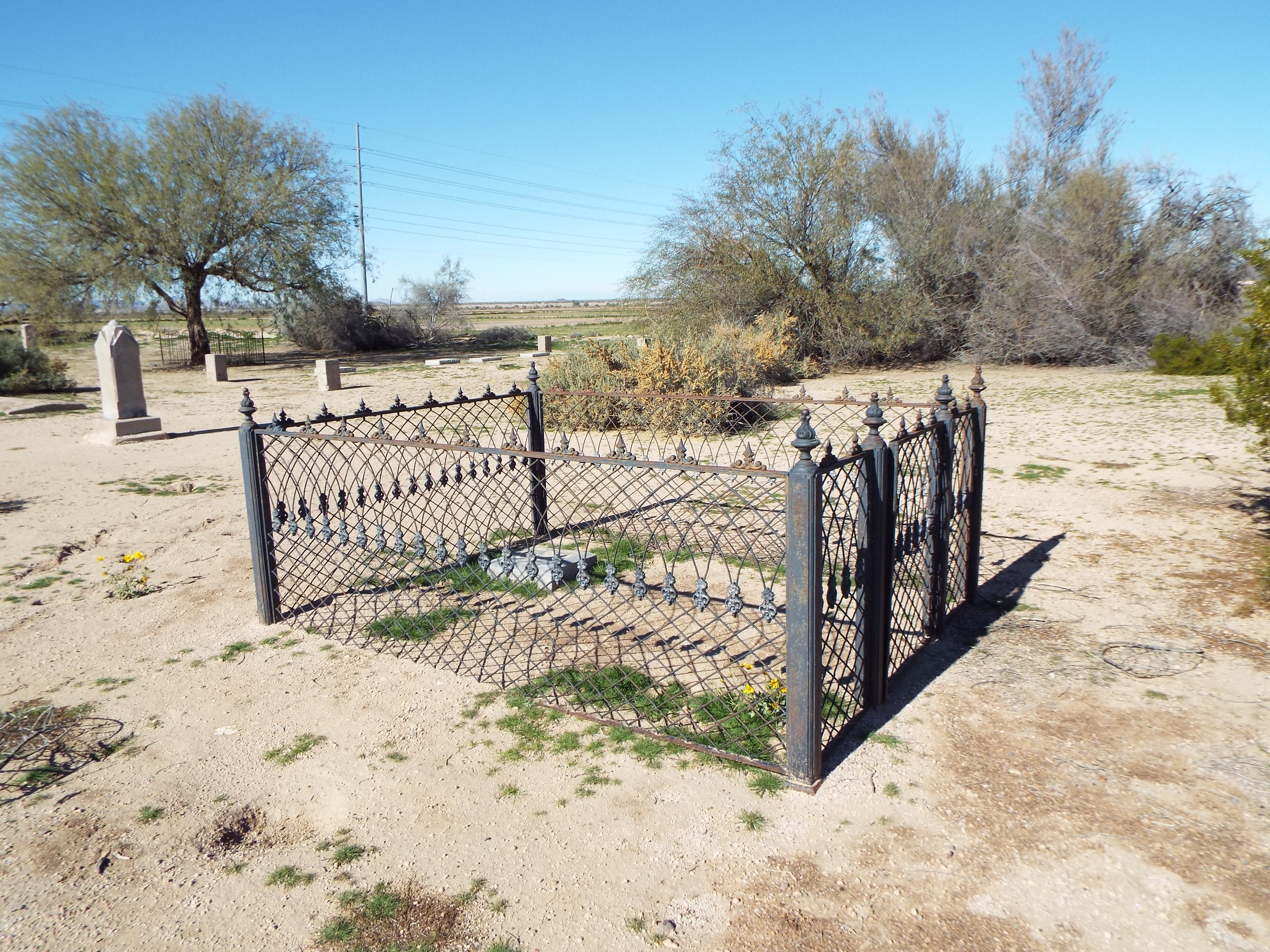
Unknown grave

== See also ==
- National Register of Historic Places listings in Pinal County, Arizona
