= Second Battle of Dragoon Springs =

Part of the Apache Wars (1862)

Coordinates: 31.9734°N 110.0129°W

- Part of the American Civil War; Apache Wars
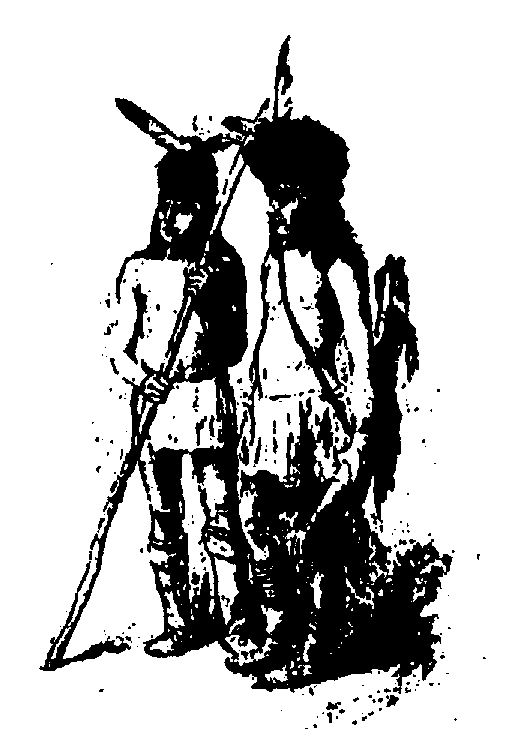
- Apache warriors
Date	May 9, 1862
Location	Dragoon Mountains, New Mexico Territory (USA), Arizona Territory (CSA); now in Cochise County, Arizona
Result	Confederate States victory, Confederacy and Indians settle a truce and forms an alliance

Belligerents
Apache	(Confederate States of America) Confederate States

Commanders and leaders
Cochise; Francisco	Unknown

Casualties and losses
5 killed	None

The Second Battle of Dragoon Springs was one of two skirmishes involving Apache warriors and Confederate soldiers in Arizona. It was fought during the American Civil War on May 9, 1862, and was a response to the First Battle of Dragoon Springs in which Confederate forces were defeated. Four men were killed in the first skirmish and several heads of livestock were captured. The rebel commander Captain Sherod Hunter, ordered his foraging squad to take back the livestock from Cochise's warriors, during which five Apaches were killed. There were no Confederate casualties.

== See also ==
- American Indian Wars
- Apache Wars
