= G. H. Oury =

American politician (1825–1891)

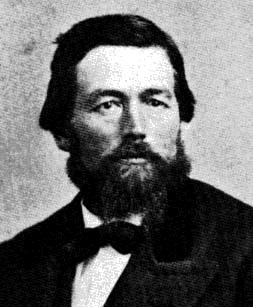

Delegate to the U.S. House of Representatives from the Arizona Territory's at-large district
- In office March 4, 1881 – March 3, 1885
- Preceded by: John G. Campbell
- Succeeded by: Curtis C. Bean

Delegate from Arizona Territory to the Provisional Congress of the Confederate States
- In office January 24, 1862 – February 17, 1862
- Preceded by: New constituency
- Succeeded by: Constituency abolished

Personal details
- Born: Granville Henderson Oury; March 12, 1825 Abingdon, Virginia, U.S.
- Died: January 11, 1891 (aged 65) Tucson, Arizona Territory
- Resting place: Adamsville Cemetery, Adamsville, Arizona, U.S. 33°01′25.8″N 111°24′31.4″W
- Party: Democratic

Military service
- Allegiance: Confederate States
- Branch/service: Confederate States Army
- Years of service: 1862–1865
- Rank: Captain
- Commands: Oury's Company, Herbert's Battalion, Arizona Cavalry
- Battles/wars: American Civil War: Siege of Tubac

Granville Henderson Oury (March 12, 1825 – January 11, 1891) was a nineteenth-century American politician, lawyer, judge, soldier, and miner.

== Early life ==
Born in Abingdon, Virginia; Granville Henderson Oury and his family moved to Bowling Green, Missouri, in 1836 where he pursued his academic studies, studied law, and was admitted to the bar in 1848. That year, he moved to San Antonio, Texas, and in 1849 to Marysville, California, where he engaged in mining. He then moved to Tucson, Arizona, in 1856 and began a law practice and was appointed a district judge for New Mexico Territory in Mesilla. Oury was involved in the infamous Crabb Massacre of April 1857, during which no more than 100 Americans were killed after an eight-day battle with Mexican forces at Caborca, Sonora. The Americans were under the command of General Henry A. Crabb, a former California senator, who was allegedly trying to take over Sonora like the filibuster William Walker. Oury was one of the men General Crabb had recruited in Tucson, and he was given the rank of captain and ordered to follow the general into Mexico after recruiting more men. However, when news reached Tucson that a superior force of Mexicans was besieging Crabb's expedition, Major R. N. Wood and Captain Oury were sent across the international border to help their compatriots. Just after crossing the border, the rescue party encountered about 200 Mexicans. A skirmish ensued which forced the Americans back across the border into Arizona. There were no casualties on the Americans' side. Of the Crabb party, all were killed except a fourteen-year-old boy and possibly one other man depending on varying sources.

== American Civil War ==
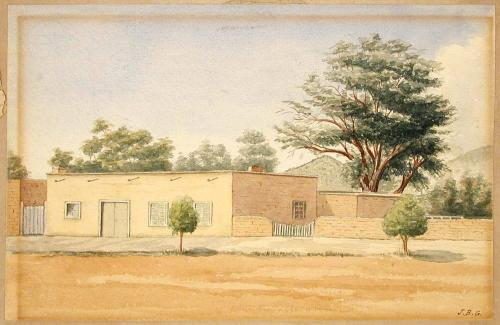
Oury House in Tucson, Arizona watercolor by Oury's son-in-law Joseph Basil Girard (Huntington Museum collection)

At the outbreak of the American Civil War in 1861, Oury was elected to the Provisional Congress of the Confederate States representing the Arizona Territory. Around this time, hostile Apaches attacked the town of Tubac, located south of Tucson. Over the course of a few days the Apaches besieged to old Presidio until the settlers were rescued by Oury and a small band of Confederate militia from Tucson. Tubac was destroyed and abandoned but the settlers were saved due to Oury and his men. Oury later resigned his seat in the Confederate Congress to serve as a captain in Herbert's Battalion of Arizona cavalry of the Confederate States Army. He also served as a colonel on the staff of General Henry Hopkins Sibley in Texas and Louisiana from 1862 to 1864. He took the oath of allegiance at Fort Mason in Arizona on October 8, 1865.

== Later life and death ==
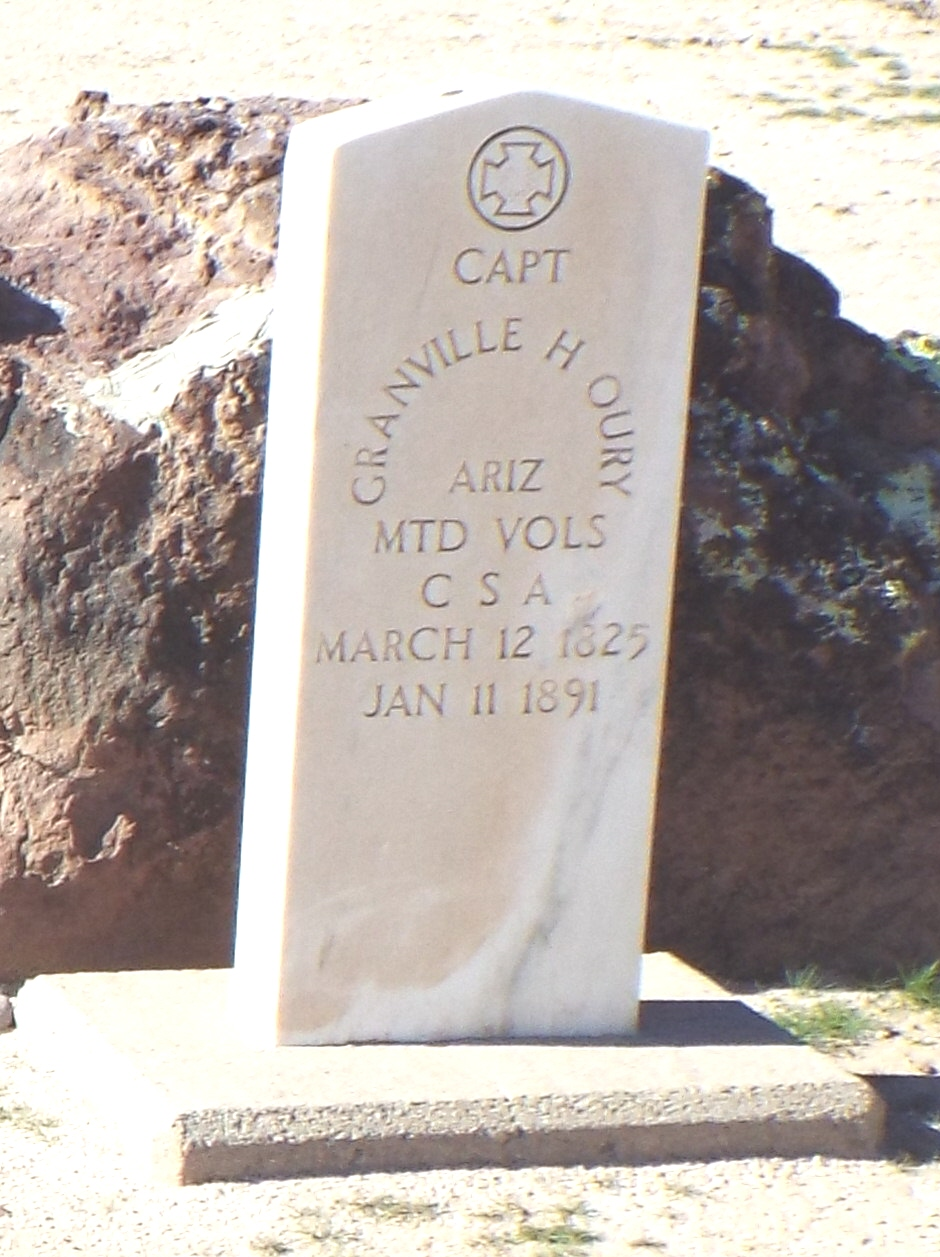
Oury's grave at Adamsville Cemetery in Adamsville, Arizona.

After the end of the war, Oury returned to his law practice in Tucson. He was elected to the 3rd Arizona Territorial Legislature in 1866, serving as Speaker of the House that year, and was appointed Arizona Territory Attorney General in 1869. He moved to Phoenix in 1871 and was appointed district attorney for Maricopa County serving from 1871 to 1873. That year his brother, William S. Oury, was involved in the Camp Grant Massacre in which over 140 Apache men, women, and children were killed. Granville was elected in 1873 and 1875 to the 7th and 8th Arizona Territorial Legislature, serving as Speaker during the 1873 session.

Oury unsuccessfully ran as a Democrat for the United States House of Representatives in 1878 and was appointed district attorney for Pinal County in 1879. He was elected a Democrat to the United States House of Representatives in 1880, reelected in 1882, serving from 1881 to 1885, not running for reelection in 1884. He served as a delegate to the 1884 Democratic National Convention in Chicago, returned to Adamsville in 1885, and resumed practicing law. He once again served as district attorney for Pinal County in 1889 and 1890. He died of throat cancer in Tucson on January 11, 1891, and was interred in the Adamsville Cemetery at Adamsville, Arizona.

== See also ==
- List of United States representatives from Arizona

Political offices
New constituency	Delegate from Arizona Territory to the Provisional Congress of the Confederate States; 1862	Constituency abolished
U.S. House of Representatives
Preceded by John G. Campbell	Delegate to the U.S. House of Representatives from the Arizona Territory's at-large congressional district 1881–1885	Succeeded by Curtis C. Bean
