= John G. Campbell =

American businessman and politician (1827–1903)

Delegate to the U.S. House of Representatives from Arizona Territory
- In office March 4, 1879 – March 4, 1881
- Preceded by: Hiram S. Stevens
- Succeeded by: Granville H. Oury

Personal details
- Born: June 25, 1827 Glasgow, Scotland
- Died: December 22, 1903 (aged 76) Prescott, Arizona Territory
- Party: Democratic

John Goulder Campbell (June 25, 1827 – December 22, 1903) was a Scottish-born American businessman and politician. He served one term as Arizona Territory's delegate in the United States House of Representatives and was elected twice, but served only once, to represent Yavapai County in the council (upper house) of the Arizona Territorial Legislature. Despite his service in the United States Congress, it is unclear as to whether he was ever a United States citizen.

== Background ==
Campbell was born on June 25, 1827, to Agnes (Hunter) and Robert Campbell in Glasgow, Scotland. He immigrated to the United States with his father in 1841, entering the country at New York City. Shortly after his arrival, Campbell was apprenticed to a baker in Detroit. He also attended night classes to supplement his education. Returning to New York City in 1846, Campbell worked as a baker until 1848.

In 1849 Campbell set out for California, traveling via Vera Cruz and Mazatlán before reaching the confluence of the Colorado and Gila rivers in July. From there he continued to San Francisco before proceeding to the Yuba River. Campbell began working as a miner in Yuba County, California, in 1850. Two years later he turned to cattle ranching in the Shasta Valley. In 1854, Campbell opened a general store in Trinity County, California. Campbell moved to Chile in 1857 where he worked as a merchant. Civil unrest in 1859 prompted Campbell's return to the United States. Upon his return, Campbell became manager of Los Angeles' LaFayette Hotel for a time before returning to San Francisco.

In early 1863, Campbell went to El Dorado Canyon in Nevada. There he built a raft and took the Colorado River south to La Paz, Arizona Territory, arriving in December. During the territorial census in 1864, Campbell was found to own US$500 in property. In late 1864, he moved to Prescott and settled there for the rest of his life. Shortly after his arrival, Campbell opened a general store. In the early 1870s, Campbell partnered with William Buffum. Beginning in 1868 Campbell diversified into ranching where he partnered with James M. Baker. By 1872, Campbell and Baker owned over 1,000 cattle and were raising sheep in the Chino Valley. Buffum and Campbell ended their partnership in 1876 with both men continuing in the mercantile business.

Campbell was married twice. His first nuptial was a common law marriage to a Chilean lady named Carmelita. The union produced one daughter and ended after she filed for divorce in January 1878. The second marriage came on May 20, 1880, when Campbell wed Marguerite Maleziex of Paris, France. The couple had six children: Antoinette (died at 10 days of age), Frank R., John G. (died age 16), Agnes, Louise M., and Lilly Belle.

== Political career ==
Besides his business interests Campbell was also active in politics. He was elected to the Yavapai County Board of Supervisors with a term running from January 1, 1867, to December 31, 1868. He became the board chairman on December 14, 1867. Campbell was elected to a second term in the early 1870s. He did not complete his second term, resigning before the August 5, 1872, board meeting. Campbell was elected to represent Yavapai County in the council (upper house) of the 5th Arizona Territorial Legislature but did not attend the session. He was nominated by the Democratic party for a seat on the Council in 1872 but lost the election by a vote of 260 to 369. Two years later he ran again and won a seat on the Council in the 8th Arizona Territorial Legislature. In 1876, Campbell made an unsuccessful run for County Treasurer.

In April 1878, Campbell announced his intention to run for Territorial Delegate. While nominally a Democrat, he ran as an Independent. His opponents were Republican Hiram S. Stevens, the incumbent, Democrat King Woolsey, and Independent Republican A. E. Davis. The campaign was dominated by the candidates' personalities and mud slinging. Campbell positioned himself as a "free and Independent" candidate capable of serving the interests of Arizona residents. In its endorsement for Campbell, the Arizona Daily Miner wrote, "His earthly possessions are in Arizona, and on the principle that, 'where our treasures are, there will our hearts be also.' he is strictly and emphatically an Arizonan." The November 5, 1878, election saw Campbell win with 1,484 votes compared to 1,258 for Stevens, 1,207 for Davis, and 915 for Woolsey. Claims of election fraud followed Campbell's victory, with the candidate being accused of using livestock, whiskey, and cash to buy the votes of "all who were willing to sacrifice their manhood for such trash." It was further accused that a Catholic priest in Yuma "was out electioneering and walking his subjects to the polls as he would drive so many sheep, and all in the interest of 'our' Campbell." Judge Charles Silent oversaw a grand jury investigation that found insufficient evidence to issue any indictments.

Campbell made a business stop in San Francisco and visited family in Brooklyn, New York before the 46th United States Congress began on March 18, 1879. In addition to the normal introductions to other members of Congress, the new delegate gave a presentation on the situation in Arizona to 150 potential immigrants to the territory on April 6, 1879. He introduced a variety of petitions and about 18 bills during his term including a bill to repeal the tariffs on movable type and paper. Campbell's only appearance in the Congressional Record came during a debate about which committee should handle a bill he introduced to allow the territorial legislature to override a veto. When asked to which committee the bill should be referred, he stated "I have no particular choice about the reference."

By the time the election of 1880 began, both the Democrats and Republicans were better organized within Arizona and each held their first successful territorial nominating conventions. When Campbell arrived at the Democratic convention, he was ill and as a result confined to his hotel room. While his name was entered into consideration it became quickly apparent that he lacked the support to win nomination and he withdrew from consideration. Campbell considered running for another political office in 1882 but decided against doing so. With the inauguration of President Grover Cleveland in 1885, Campbell submitted an application to become Arizona Territorial Governor but was not selected.

== Later life ==
Campbell returned to his mercantile business after leaving office. He also was active in other business ventures, joining with other prominent Arizonans in the mid-1880s as a promoter for the Prescott and Arizona Central Railway which sought to build a north–south rail line within Arizona. In 1894, Campbell sold his store and used the proceeds to build a hotel in Prescott, the Depot House. He operated the hotel until 1901 when declining health forced his retirement.

On June 9, 1891, Campbell filed a claim for reparations for losses he had suffered during an Indian raid in November 1868. When the case came before the United States Court of Claims, he was asked for proof he was United States citizen. Campbell assumed he had become a citizen automatically when his father was naturalized following their migration from Scotland. He was unable however to find any record of his father's naturalization. With Campbell unable to establish his citizenship, the court denied his claim. The matter would not be finally settled until after Campbell's death. In 1912, Representative Carl Hayden introduced legislation to provide relief to Campbell's heirs. Hayden's argument was "One who has served in the House of Representatives ought to be presumed to be a citizen of the United States." The legislation was not passed until 1915 with the Court of Claims taking until February 19, 1917, to approve payment of US$470 in reparations.

Campbell died in Prescott on December 22, 1903. He was buried in Prescott's Mountain View Cemetery.

U.S. House of Representatives
Preceded by Hiram S. Stevens	Delegate to the U.S. House of Representatives from Arizona Territory's at-large congressional district March 4, 1879 – March 3, 1881	Succeeded by Granville H. Oury
