= Joseph Basil Girard =

American military doctor and frontier artist (1846–1918)

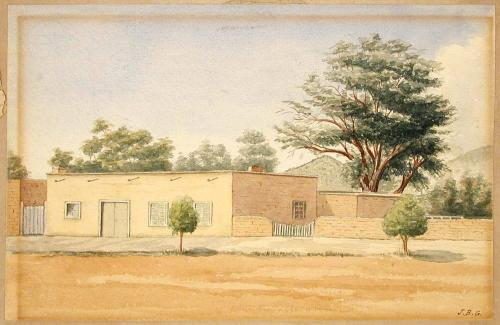
Oury House in Tucson, Arizona watercolor by Joseph Basil Girard (Huntington Museum of Art)

Joseph Basil Girard (December 26, 1846 – August 25, 1918) was a U.S. Army surgeon and frontier artist who painted many landscape watercolors, some of which are now held in the collection of the Huntington Museum.

== Biography ==
Girard was born at Courpière, Puy-de-Dôme, France. He graduated from University of Michigan Medical School and was an assistant surgeon beginning in about 1867 "at various Western posts and in Hawaii and the Philippines."

Girard was stationed in Wyoming Territory from 1867 to 1872 and according to a Wyoming historical journal, "In the 1870s he did pencil sketches of Forts D. A. Russell, Fetterman, Sanders and Fred Steele, all in what was then the territory of Wyoming. Girard later made watercolors from these sketches...Although more talented technically than the military picture-makers already mentioned, Girard cannot be considered the best of his kind to work in the state. That honor should probably go to Philippe Régis De Trobriand."

In 1872 he was transferred to Fort McDowell in Arizona Territory and per a feature article on Girard in Arizona Highways magazine, "Girard's responsibilities seem to us today like a collection of often unrelated assignments. He was expected to deliver babies, record outside temperatures, extract arrows, set broken bones, treat bullet wounds (many accidentally inflicted), maintain comprehensive sickness records, and while administering the only medical facilities in central Arizona, also find time to document the area's indigenous plants, animals, and birds." His botanic collections at Western posts where he was stationed in Arizona were considered notable early contributions to the scientific study of those places. Girard was with General George Crook in the Apache Wars in 1873, stationed at Fort Apache in 1874, "and for nine years saw almost continuous service in Indian warfare." He also reported on the ecosystem of the canyon in which the fort was situated, reporting the presence of wild turkeys. Transferred to Tucson in 1874, he married Louise Oury, daughter of then-Pima County sheriff Granville Henderson Oury.

He was promoted to major and surgeon in 1888, lieutenant-colonel and deputy surgeon-general in 1901, and colonel and assistant surgeon-general in 1902. He was appointed Chief Surgeon for the military Department of the Philippines from 1904 to 1906 and Chief Surgeon of the Department of Texas from 1907 to 1910. Many of Girard's watercolors were painted during this era based on sketches made during his earlier postings. He retired in 1910, on attaining the age of 64 years.

He retired to San Antonio, Texas and died of natural causes in 1918. He is buried at Jefferson Barracks National Cemetery in Missouri.
