= First Battle of Dragoon Springs =

Part of the Apache Wars (1862)

Coordinates: 31.997613°N 110.022508°W

- Part of the Apache Wars, American Civil War
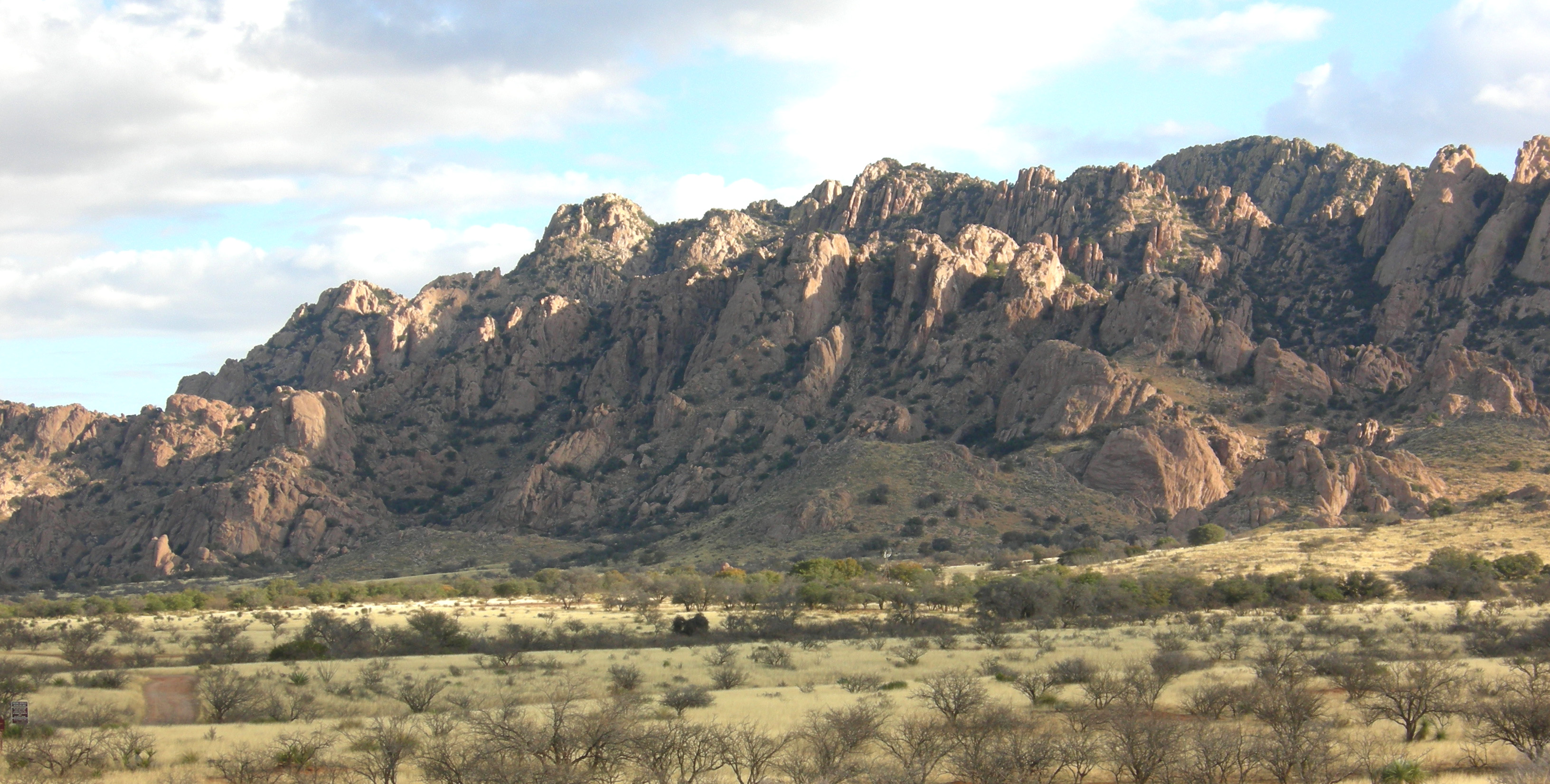
- Dragoon Mountains
| Date | May 5, 1862 |
| Location | Dragoon Mountains, New Mexico Territory (USA), Arizona Territory (CSA); now in Cochise County, Arizona |
| Result | Apache victory |

Belligerents
| (Confederate States of America) Confederate States | Apache |

Commanders and leaders
| (Confederate States of America) Sergeant Sam Ford † | Cochise; Francisco |

Strength
| Unknown | ~100 warriors |

Casualties and losses
| 4 killed | Unknown |

The First Battle of Dragoon Springs was a minor skirmish between a small troop of Confederate dragoons of Governor John R. Baylor's Arizona Rangers, and a band of Apache warriors during the American Civil War. It was fought on May 5, 1862, near the present-day town of Benson, Arizona, in Confederate Arizona.

== Background ==
Creation of a separate Arizona Territory distinct from the New Mexico Territory in the late 1850s was thwarted over disagreement in Congress on the new territory's boundary: Northern representatives argued for a north–south division along the present Arizona-New Mexico boundary, whereas Southern representatives pushed for an east–west division along the 34th parallel. With the coming of the Civil War, the new Confederate government was free to establish the boundary as it saw fit.

Shortly after the arrival of Confederate forces from Texas, secessionists met at Mesilla to adopt an Ordinance of Secession, on March 16, 1861. This aim became a reality following the Confederate victory at the First Battle of Mesilla on July 25, 1861. On August 1, 1861, Lt. Col. John R. Baylor, commanding the victorious Confederate troops at Mesilla, issued a proclamation declaring the creation of a provisional Confederate Territory of Arizona, to include all of the former United States Territory of New Mexico south of the 34th parallel north. Baylor named himself governor and set up a territorial government that would continue in operation until the Confederates were forced out of New Mexico in July 1862.

This Territory of Arizona was officially declared by Confederate President Jefferson Davis on February 14, 1862, and shortly thereafter Confederate forces were deployed on the ambitious New Mexico Campaign to gain control of the Southwest.

In order to make good the Confederacy's claim to the western portion of their new Arizona Territory, Confederate soldiers, commanded by Capt. Sherod Hunter, were ordered to occupy Tucson, arriving there on February 28, 1862. They occupied the town until May 14, 1862, and it was a detachment of these troops that was involved in the fight at Dragoon Springs on May 5.

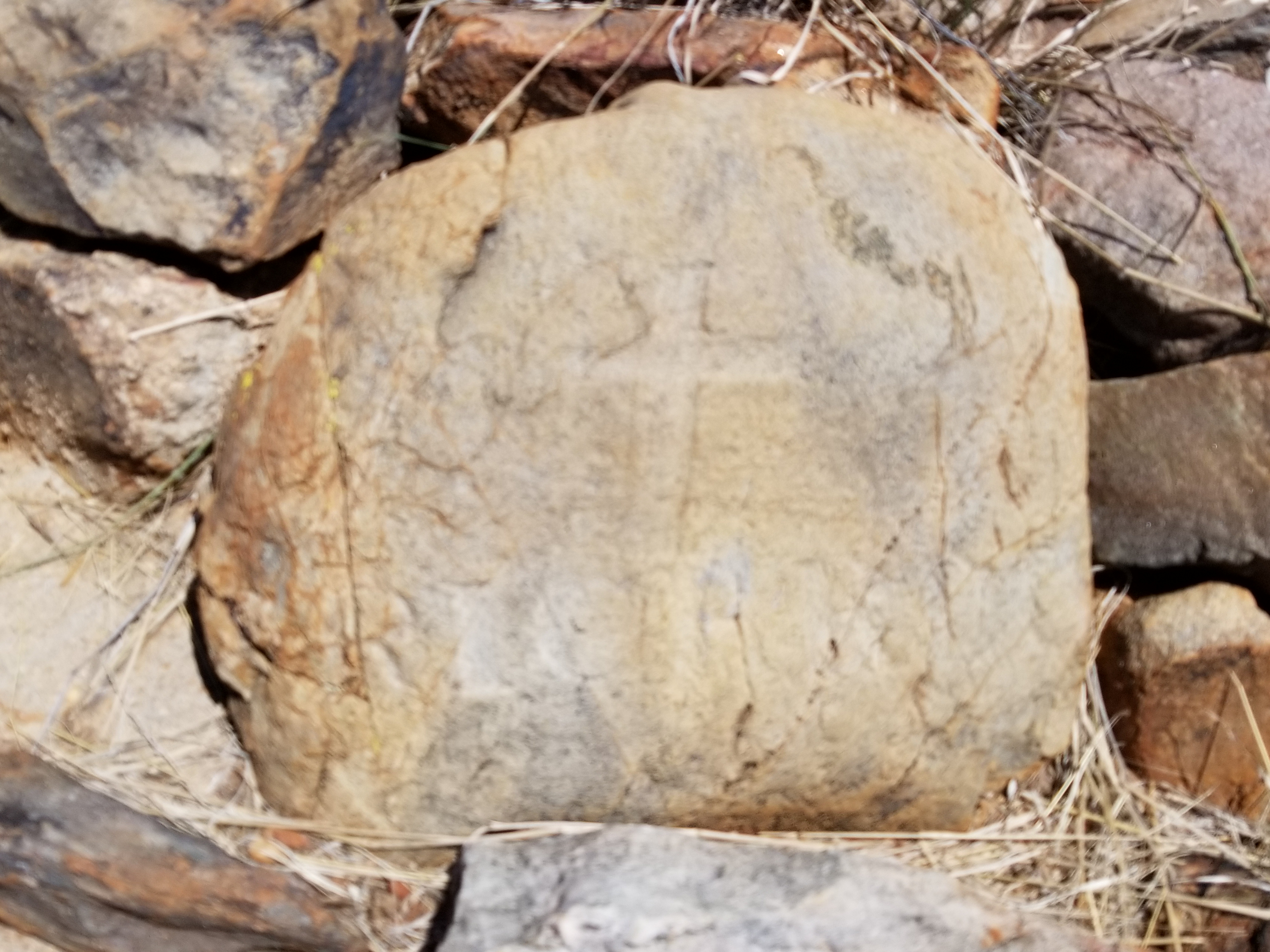
Ricardo gravestone

== Battle ==
On May 5, 1862, a small band of mounted Confederates escorting Union prisoners to Texas was encamped at an abandoned Butterfield Overland Mail stagecoach station and spring in the Dragoon Mountains, about 16 miles from the present-day town of Benson and near Dragoon, Arizona. A force of about 100 Chiricahua Apache warriors, commanded by the war chiefs Cochise and Francisco, ambushed the party. Three Confederate soldiers and a young Mexican stock herder named "Ricardo" were killed. The Apaches succeeded in capturing a large number of livestock and horses. This minor skirmish is noted for causing the Confederacy's westernmost battle deaths and is the only known engagement in which Confederate soldiers were killed within the modern confines of Arizona. It is often included as a part of the Apache Wars fought between Apaches and Americans between 1851 and 1900.

== Aftermath ==
After the battle the men buried near the Dragoon Springs stage station with one of the Union prisoners cutting into rough stone the words "S. Ford, May 5th, 1862" and "Ricardo." A few days later, on May 9, after hearing of the attack, Capt. Sherod Hunter ordered his men to take back the captured herd of cattle and horses, as well as to avenge the deaths of their fellow soldiers. The Confederates succeeded, recapturing the stolen animals and killing five Apaches with no loss of their own. You can visit the graves today and still see the inscriptions carved on the rocks.

== See also ==
- List of battles won by Indigenous peoples of the Americas
- New Mexico Territory in the American Civil War
- American Indian Wars

== Sources ==
- Finch, L. Boyd. Confederate Pathway to the Pacific: Major Sherod Hunter and the Arizona Territory, C.S.A. Tucson, Arizona: Arizona Historical Society Press, 1996.
- Horn, Calvin P., and William S. Wallace, Editors. Confederate Victories in the Southwest: Prelude to Defeat. Albuquerque, New Mexico: Horn and Wallace, 1961.
- Kerby, Robert Lee. The Confederate Invasion of New Mexico and Arizona, 1861–1862. Tucson, Arizona: Westernlore Press, 1958.
- Masich, Andrew E. The Civil War in Arizona. Norman, University of Oklahoma Press, 2006.
- Rodgers, Robert L. "The Confederate States Organized Arizona in 1862." Southern Historical Society Papers, Volume 28 (1900).
- Sonnichsen, Charles Leland. Tucson: The Life and Times of an American City. Norman, Oklahoma: University of Oklahoma Press, 1982.
- Sweeney, Edwin R. Cochise: Chiricahua Apache Chief. Norman, Oklahoma: University of Oklahoma Press, 1995.
- Walker, Charles S. "Confederate Government in Dona Ana County As Shown in the Records of the Probate Court, 1861–1862, New Mexico Historical Review, Vol. VI (1931), pp. 253–302.
