= Sherod Hunter =

Confederate Army officer

- Born: March 5, 1834; Lincoln County, Tennessee
- Died: Unknown (c. 1870); Unknown (possibly Mexico)
- Military career
- Allegiance: Confederate States of America
- Branch: Confederate States Army
- Service years: 1861–1865
- Rank: Colonel
- Unit: Company A, Arizona Rangers
- Conflicts: American Civil War Arizona Campaign: Battle of Picacho Pass; Second Battle of Dragoon Springs; Second Battle of Mesilla; Second Bayou Teche Campaign Red River Campaign

Sherod Hunter (March 5, 1834 – ?) was the commander of the Confederate unit operating against Union Army forces in present-day Arizona during the American Civil War. He later commanded various Confederate cavalry units elsewhere in the Trans-Mississippi Theater.

== Early life ==
Sherod Hunter was born on March 5, 1834, in Lincoln County, Tennessee, but was orphaned in 1840 and raised by various relatives. In November 1855, Hunter married the daughter of his business partner, Thomas Goodrich, with whom he operated a grocery business. On March 3, 1857, a son was born to Hunter and his wife. However, weakened by the hard childbirth, his wife died ten days later, on Friday, March 13, 1857; his son died soon afterward on July 6.

Following this double tragedy, Hunter sold his interest in his business to his father-in-law and left Tennessee. About 1858 or 1859, he settled and began to farm land beside the Mimbres River, near Mowry City in Doña Ana County (now Luna County), New Mexico Territory.

== Civil War ==
Hunter began his service with the Confederacy in May 1861, after local Apaches drove him from his farm in southwestern New Mexico. He joined Captain George Frazer's Company of Arizona Rangers and was promoted Lieutenant of the unit on August 1, 1861. The company was part of a battalion of Texas troops under Colonel John R. Baylor, which had recently occupied the town of Mesilla, New Mexico. In January 1862, Hunter, having risen to the rank of captain, was sent west at the head of Company A, Arizona Rangers by General Henry Hopkins Sibley, who was preparing an invasion of New Mexico from Texas. Hunter's destination was Tucson, Arizona, and his mission was to protect its pro-Confederate citizens from Apache raids and to watch for any Union forces advancing from California.

Hunter's 54-man detachment, along with Colonel James Riley and a small escort traveling to Mexico on Sibley's behalf, arrived in Tucson on February 28, 1862, and established Confederate occupation of the town. Hunter's men fought engagements against the California Column at Stanwix Station and Picacho Pass before retreating east to Texas in May 1862. During the retreat, four of Hunter's men were killed by Apaches in the Dragoon Mountains at the First Battle of Dragoon Springs. Hunter retaliated four days later at the Second Battle of Dragoon Springs. The Confederate retreat from Arizona was followed by the Union reoccupation of Tucson on May 20.

Hunter rejoined Sibley's army after its failed New Mexico invasion, seeing further service in Texas and Louisiana. On June 23, 1863, Hunter, now a major in the Confederate Army, took part in a successful attack on Union troops at Brashear City, Louisiana; the Union force surrendered to Hunter after a brief resistance.

== See also ==
- Jack Swilling
