= Adamsville, Arizona =

Ghost town in Pinal County, Arizona

- Ghost town
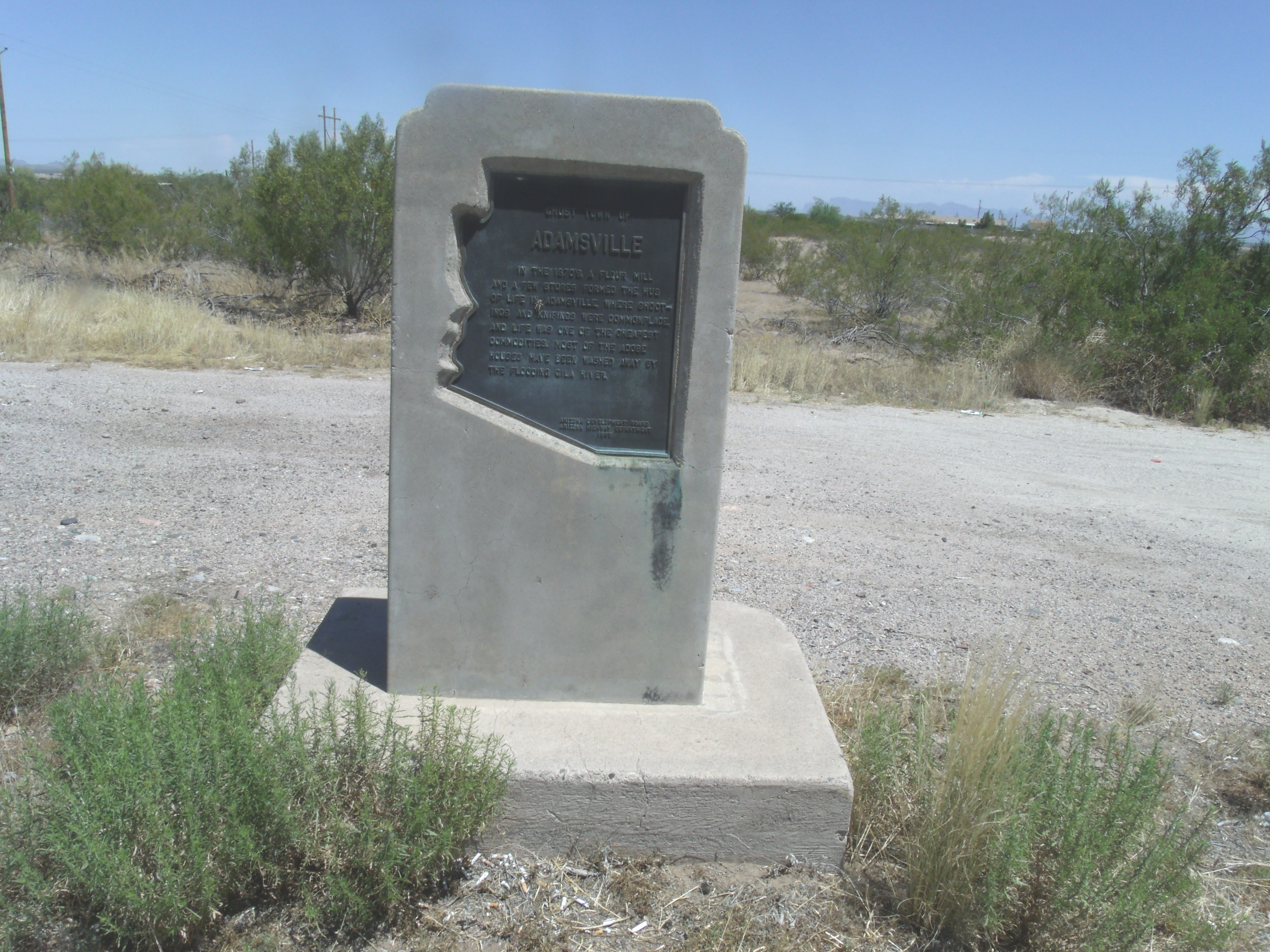
- Adamsville Ghost Town Marker

- Location of Adamsville in Arizona Adamsville, Arizona (the United States)
- Coordinates: 33°00′46″N 111°26′31″W
- Country: United States
- State: Arizona
- County: Pinal
- Elevation: 1,450 ft (442 m)

Population (2010)
  - Total: 0
- Time zone: UTC-7 (Mountain (MST))
  - Summer (DST): UTC-7 (MST)
- ZIP codes: 85132
- Area code: 520
- GNIS feature ID: U.S. Geological Survey Geographic Names Information System: Adamsville, Arizona

Adamsville was a populated place in Pinal County, Arizona. Once a thriving farm town, it became a ghost town by the 1920s. Adamsville is located at an elevation is 1,450 feet (442 m), on the south bank of the Gila River, west of Florence, Arizona.

== History ==
Adamsville was one of the first two towns formed in Pinal County, Arizona. It was named for its original settler in 1866, Fred A. Adams. When a post office was established there in 1871, it was named Sanford (for a Captain George B. Sanford of the First U.S. Cavalry), by a political enemy of Mr. Adams, Richard McCormick. The town had stores, homes, a post office and a flour mill and water tanks. Local residents continued to use the original name, causing confusion which existed until 1876, when the post office was discontinued. In 1900, the Gila River overflowed and wiped out most of the town. Those who survived the flood moved to the town of Florence. The inscription on the marker reads as follows: "In the 1870s, a flour mill and a few stores formed the hub of life in Adamsville, where shootings and knifings were commonplace, and life was one of the cheapest commodities. Most of the adobe houses have been washed away by the flooding Gila River". Listed in the National Register of Historic Places in 1970, reference #10000114. The entire settlement was gone by 1920. Adams died in 1910 and is buried in the Adamsville A.O.U.W. (Ancient Order of United Workmen) Cemetery.

== Demographics ==
Historical population
Census	Pop.	Note	%±
1870	400		—
1880	39		−90.2%
U.S. Decennial Census

Adamsville first appeared on the 1870 U.S. Census as an unincorporated village. It was then located within Pima County. It became a part of Pinal County with its creation in 1875. It reported 400 residents in 1870, all White. It was tied with the village of Apache Pass as the then-second most populous locale in Pima County, behind Tucson, and was the fourth largest recorded community in the entire territory of Arizona. In 1880, it reported as the village of Sanford, with just 39 residents. It was the second-least recorded populated community, tied with the village of Plomosa, and just ahead of Casa Grande. It did not report again on the census.

== Cemetery ==
Adamsville A.O.U.W. Cemetery is cemetery in Adamsville.

== See also ==
- List of historic properties in Florence, Arizona
- National Register of Historic Places listings in Pinal County, Arizona
