= Wilson's Farm =

Neighbourhood in Charleston, South Carolina, United States

Coordinates: 32.796°N 79.947°W

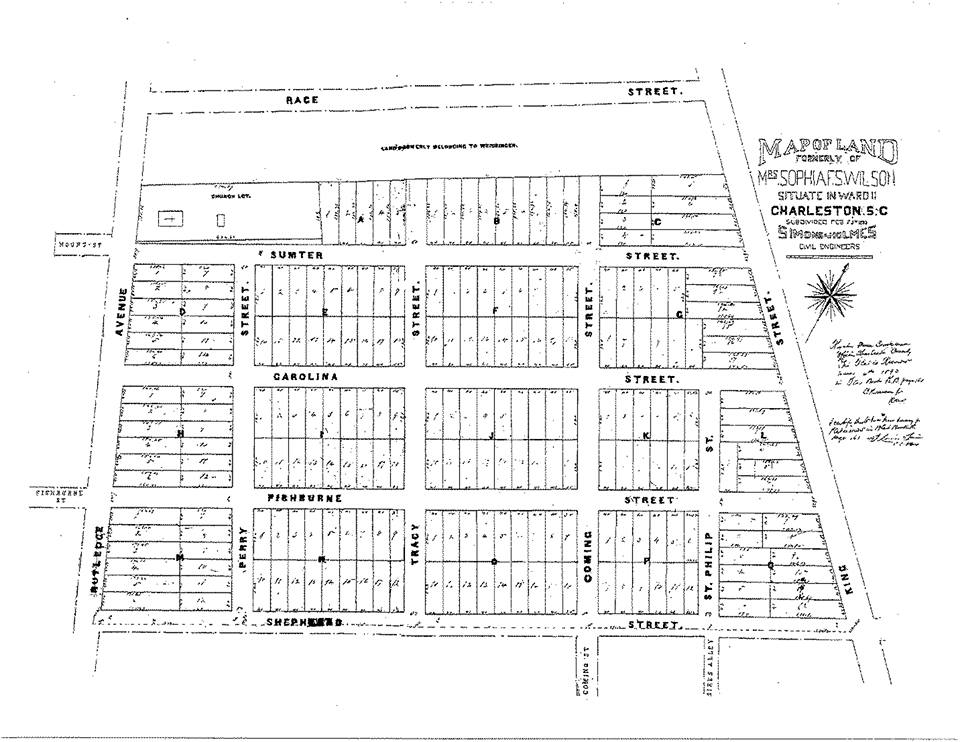
A plat of the farmland of Sophia Wilson from 1893 defines the contours of the present-day Wilson's Farm neighborhood.

Wilson's Farm is a neighborhood in Charleston, South Carolina, United States. By 1746, a 55-acre tract of the upper Charleston peninsula had been subdivided from a larger parcel and sold to John Drayton who used the land as a farm known as "Pickpocket." In 1757, 52-acres were transferred to Andrew Fesch and Peter Guinard. Pickpocket Plantation was managed by Sophia Faesch, and the house on the plantation was known as "Sophy Hall."

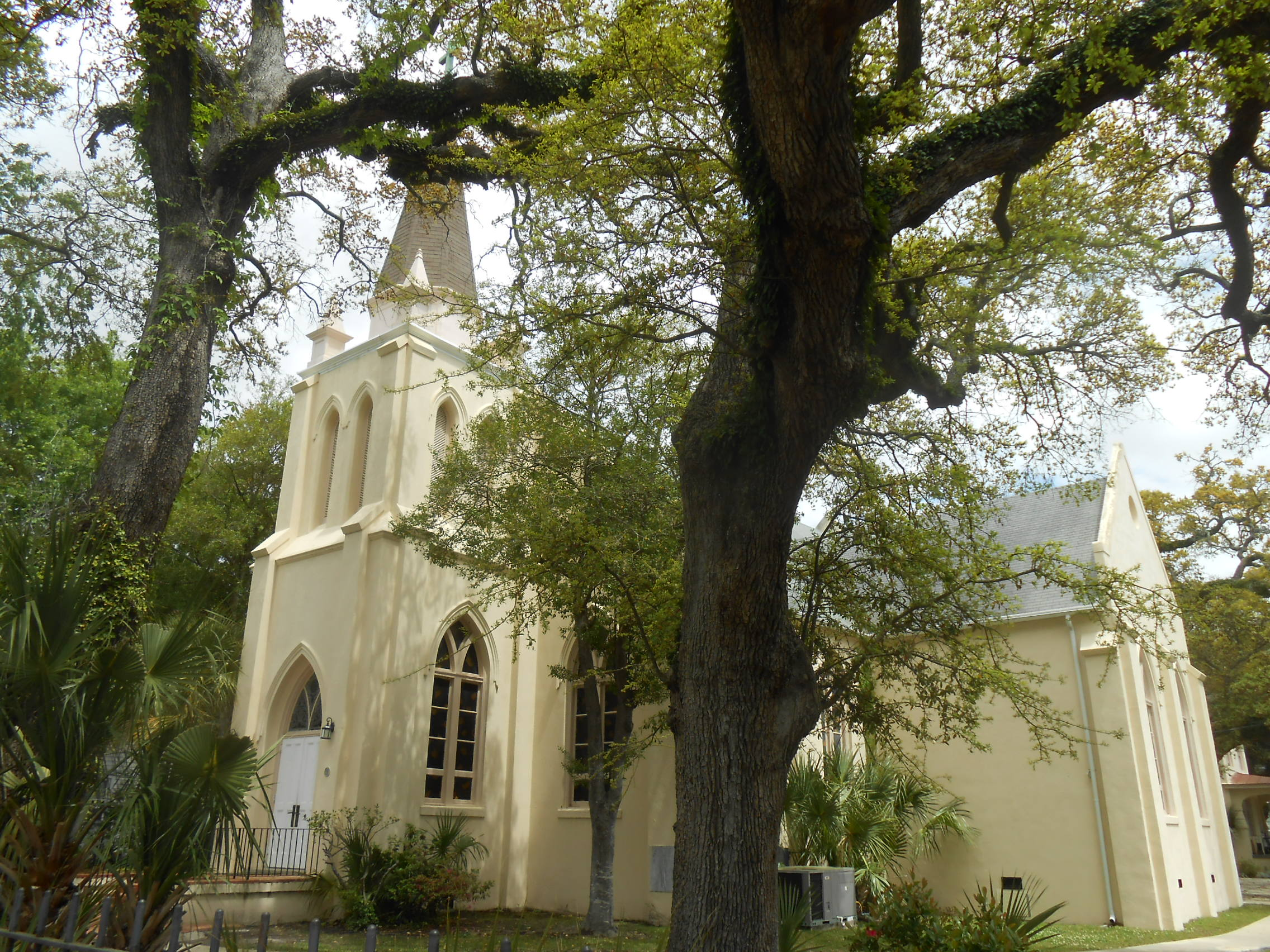
Property at the northwest corner of Wilson's Farm (now 570 Rutledge Ave.) has been used for church purposes since Mrs. Shepherd conveyed the land to the Episcopal church in 1823.

By the 19th century, the land was owned by the Shepherd family. In 1823, Mrs. Sophia Francis Perry Shepherd granted four lots in what she envisioned as “Shepherdboro” to the Episcopal Church. She kept a 30 by 30 foot plot, however, for use as a family burial ground. The burial ground still exists just to the east of what is today operated as the Salem Baptist Church. After she died on September 16, 1873, Mrs. Wilson was buried in the burial ground she had reserved.

A plat was drawn in 1893 which divided 36.53 acres of the farm into regular streets and lots for development. Legal fights between the family and the city delayed sales but began in 1898 and picked up pace in 1902 when commercial real estate companies were used to market the development.

In 2012, the Preservation Society of Charleston held a special tour of the Wilson's Farm neighborhood. The Society wanted to focus attention on areas above the Highway 17 divide of the Charleston peninsula.

== Gallery ==
Development of housing in Wilson's Farm began in the late 1890s and was largely complete by 1910. The build out of the neighborhood bridged an earlier period during which builders followed local customs (resulting in several traditional Charleston single houses) and a modern era during which builders followed national trends (resulting in American foursquares and variants). Regardless of form, late Victorian detailing can be seen on many of the houses.

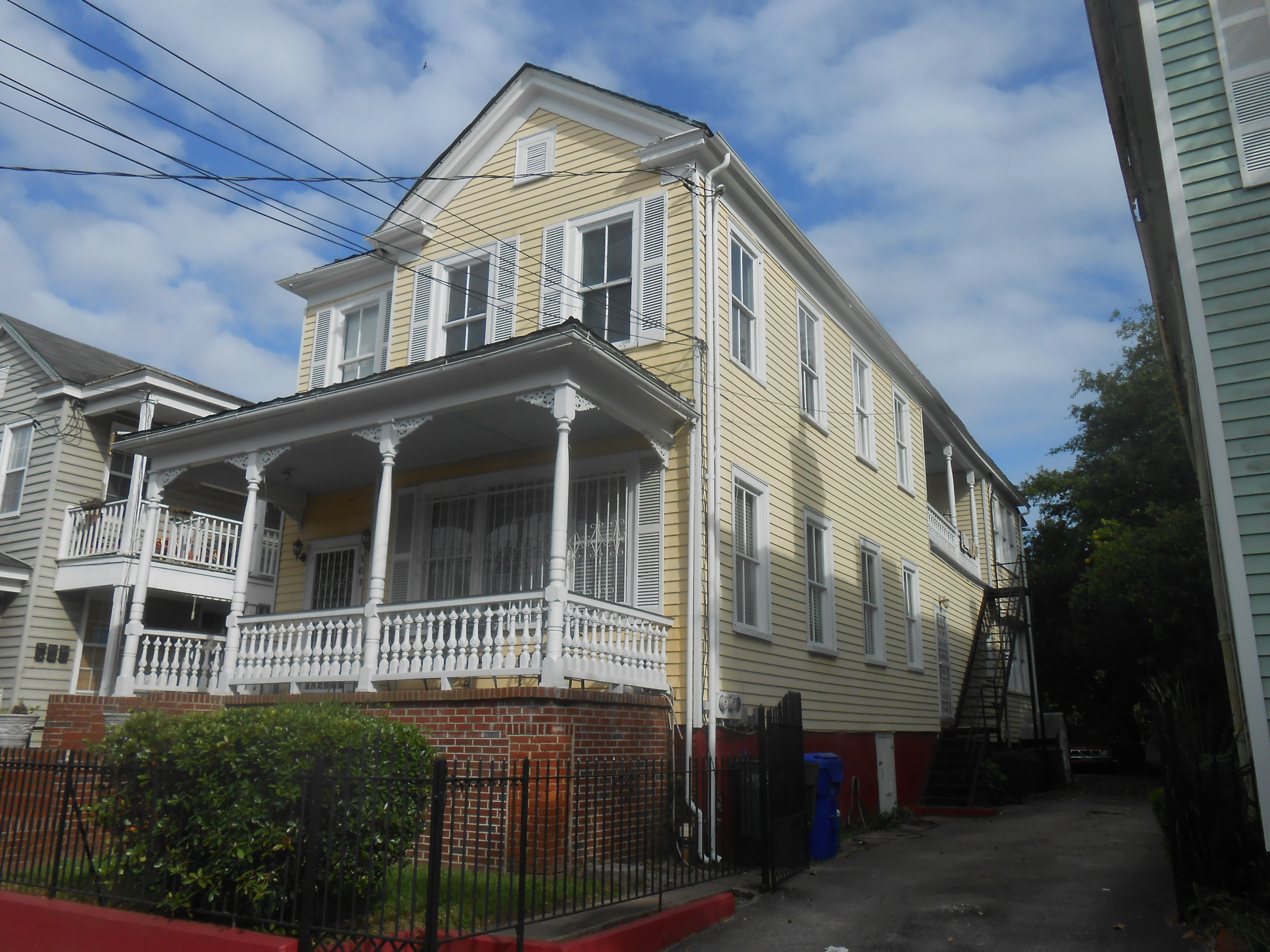
101 Fishburne Street

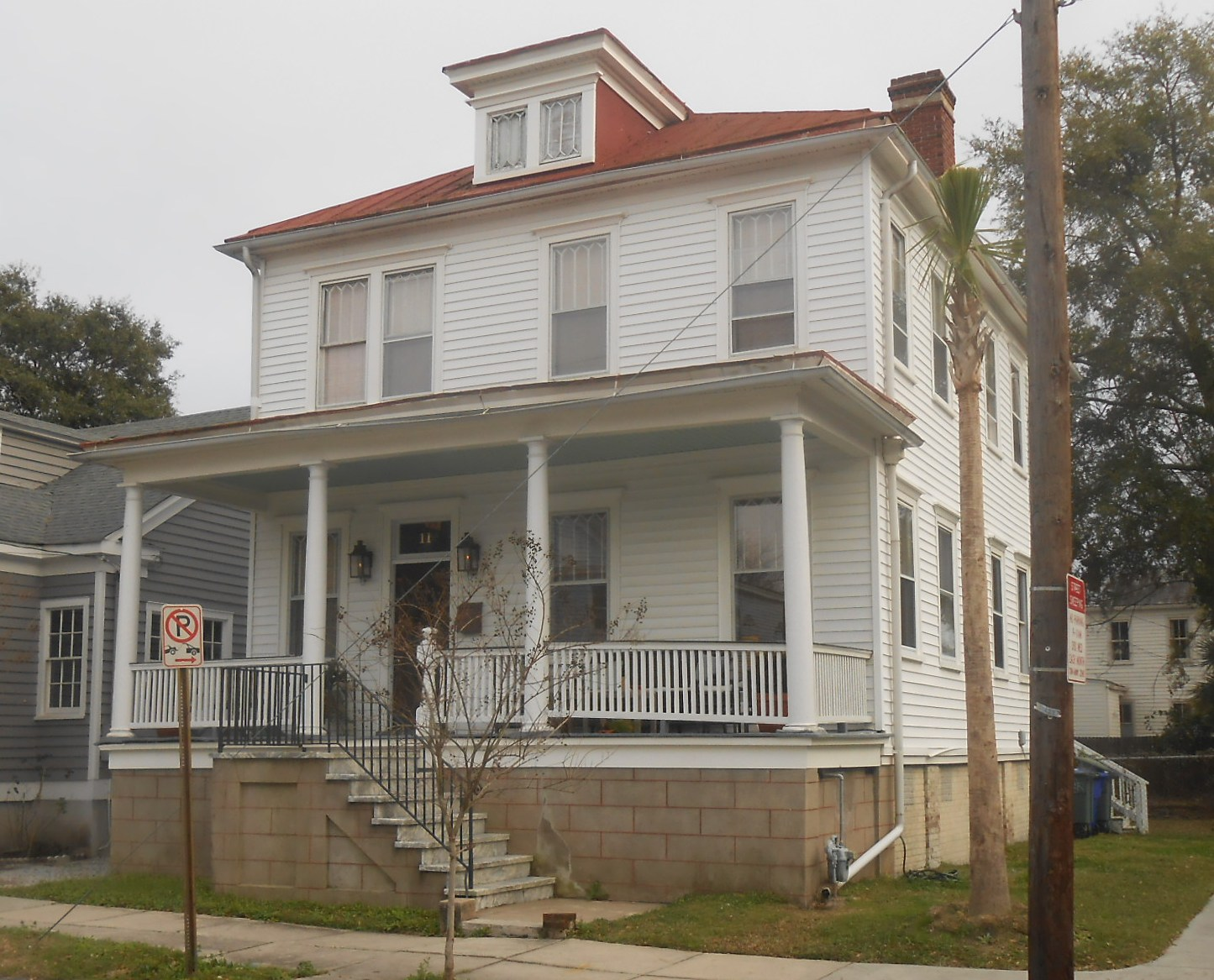
11 Carolina Street

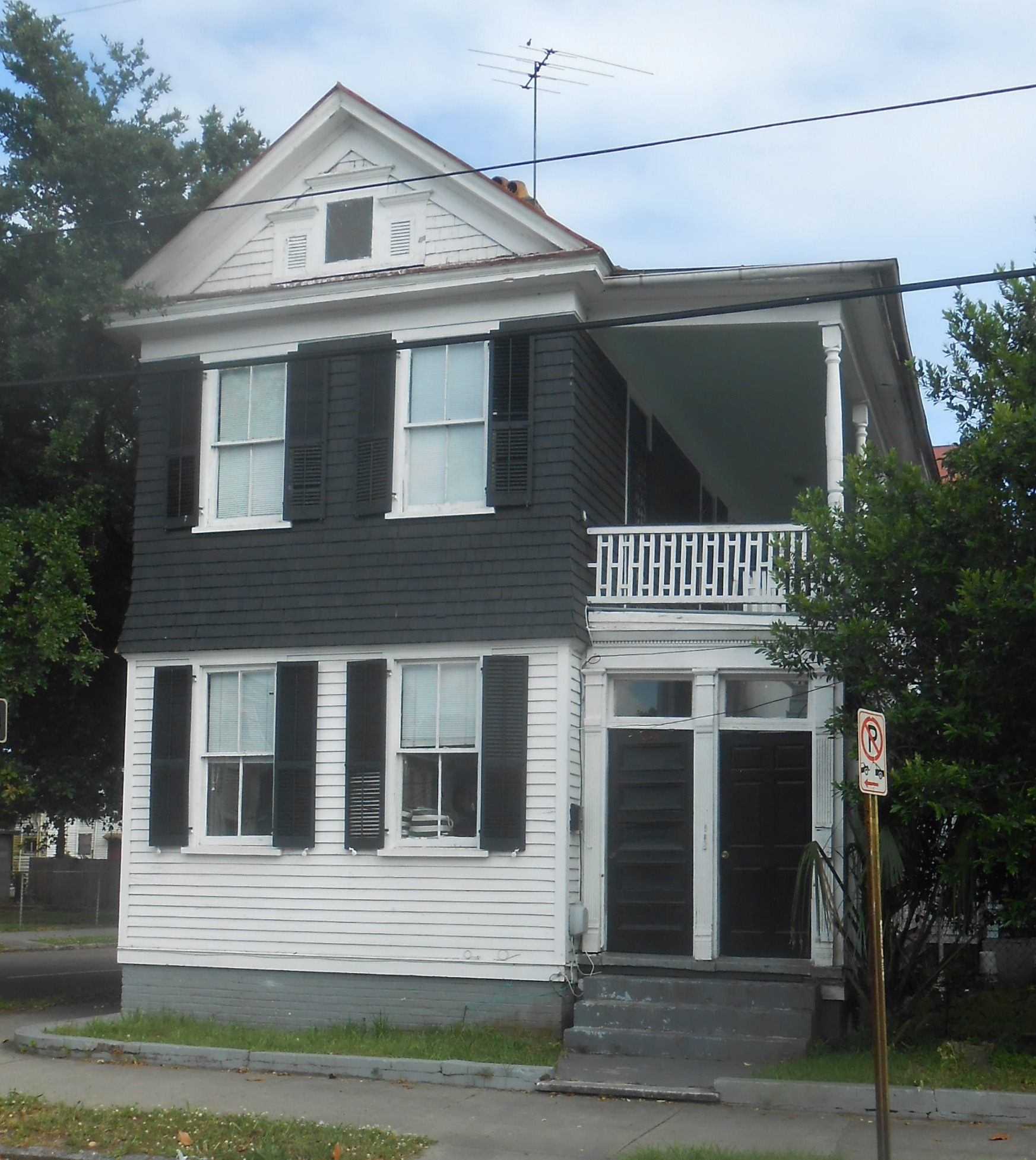
13 Carolina Street

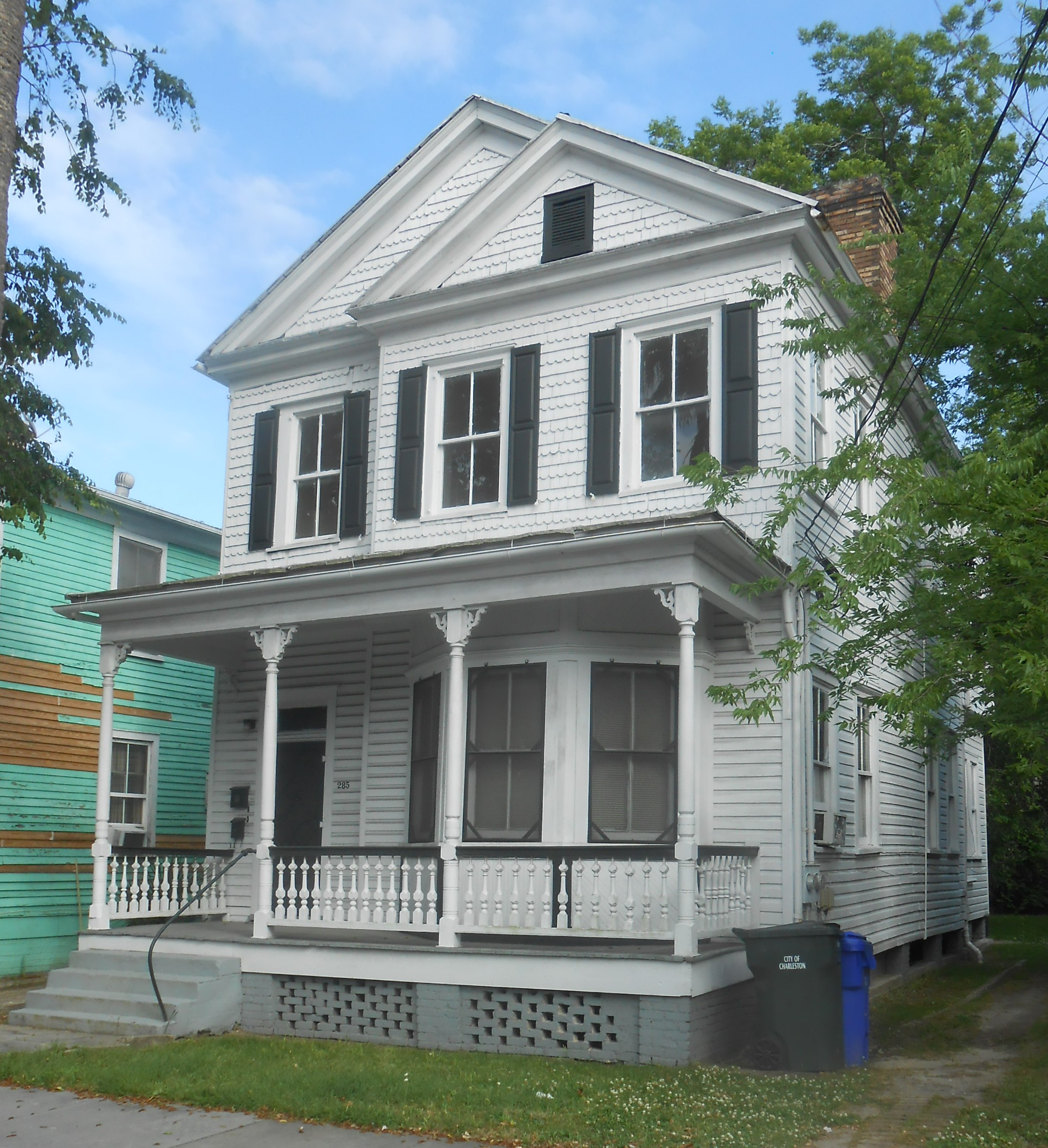
285 Sumter Street

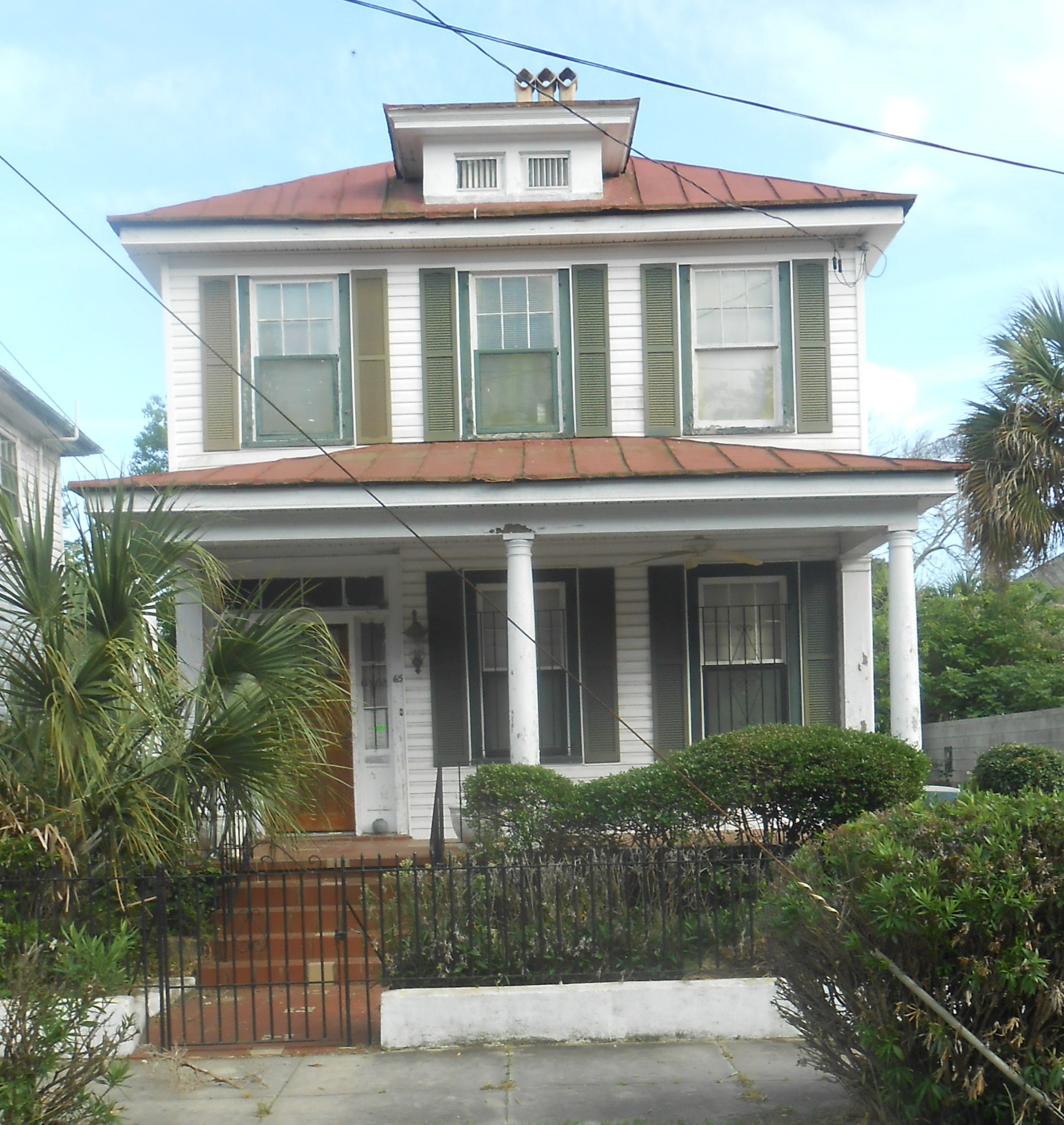
65 Carolina Street

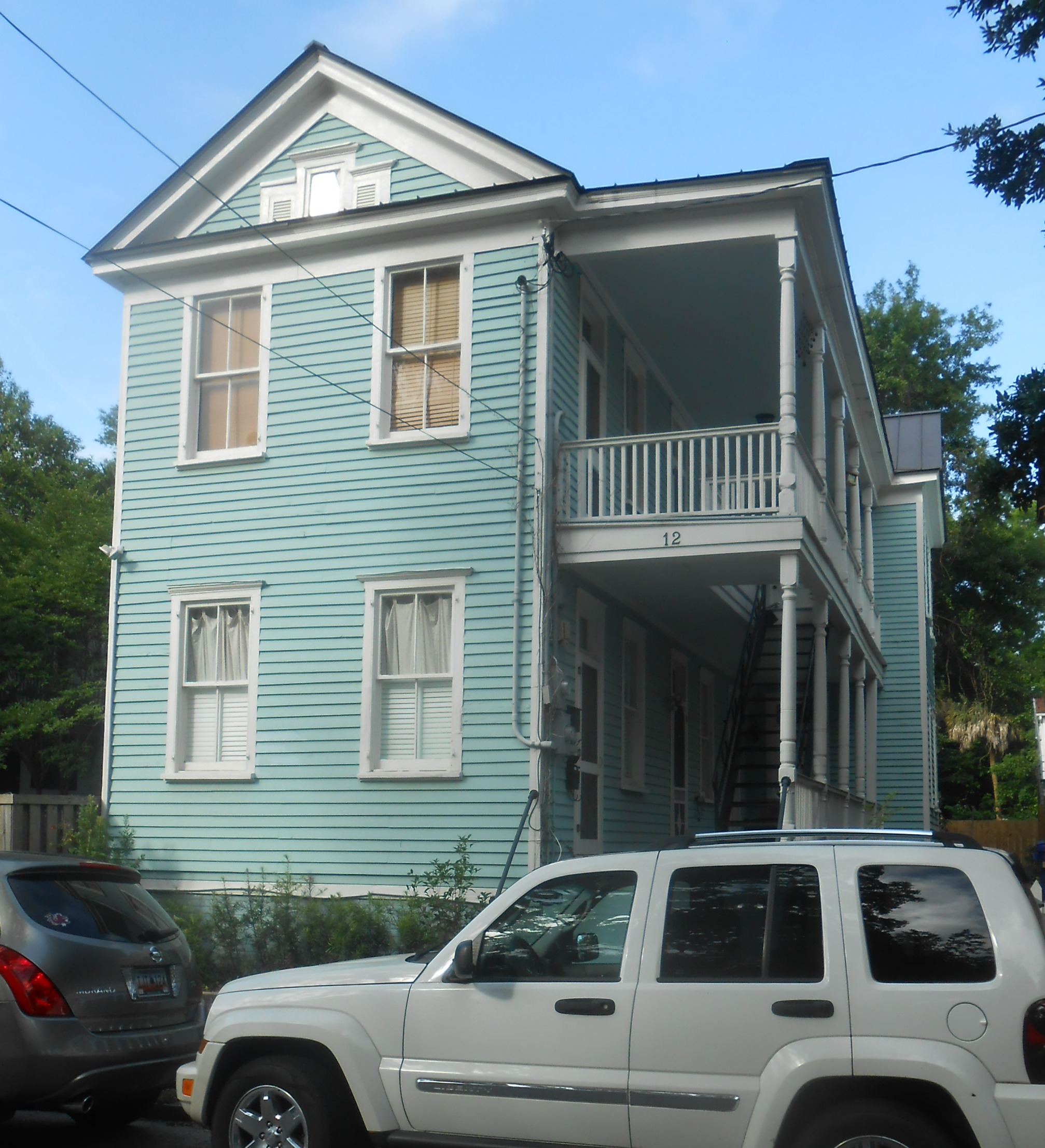
12 Perry Street
