= Big Horn Expedition =

Military campaign in the Great Sioux War

- Part of the Great Sioux War of 1876
Date	March 1–26, 1876
Location	Wyoming Territory, Montana Territory
Result	Inconclusive

Belligerents
Cheyenne; Oglala Lakota Sioux	United States

Commanders and leaders
Old Bear; He Dog	George Crook; Joseph J. Reynolds

Strength
~250	883

Casualties and losses
4–6 killed, including women and children 1–3 wounded	4 killed+1 DOW; 7 wounded 67 injured

This event should not be confused with the Powder River Expedition (1865).

The Big Horn Expedition, or Bighorn Expedition, was a military operation of the United States Army against the Lakota Sioux and Cheyenne Indians in Wyoming Territory and Montana Territory. Although soldiers destroyed one Northern Cheyenne and Oglala Lakota village at the Battle of Powder River, the expedition solidified Lakota Sioux and Northern Cheyenne resistance against the United States attempt to force them to sell the Black Hills and live on a reservation, beginning the Great Sioux War of 1876.

== Background ==
The Treaty of Fort Laramie (1868) granted the Lakota Sioux and their northern Cheyenne allies a reservation, including the Black Hills, in Dakota Territory and a large area of "unceded territory" in what became Montana and Wyoming. Both areas were for the exclusive use of the Indians, and whites except for government officials, were forbidden to trespass. In August 1874, soldiers of the Black Hills Expedition under Lieutenant Colonel George A. Custer confirmed the discovery of gold in the Black Hills. This caused the United States to attempt to buy the Hills from the Sioux. The U.S. ordered all bands of Lakota and Cheyenne to come to the Indian agencies on the reservation by January 31, 1876 to negotiate the sale. Some of the bands did not comply, and when the deadline of January 31 passed, the Commissioner of Indian Affairs John Q. Smith wrote that "without the receipt of any news of Sitting Bull's submission, I see no reason why...military operations against him should not commence at once." On February 8, 1876, General Philip Sheridan telegraphed Generals George Crook and Alfred H. Terry, ordering them to undertake winter campaigns against the "hostiles."

== March 1-3 ==
In bitterly cold weather, Brigadier General George Crook, commander of the Department of the Platte, marched north from Fort Fetterman near Douglas, Wyoming on March 1, 1876. General Crook's objective was to strike against the Indians while they were at their most vulnerable in their winter camps. Sitting Bull, Crazy Horse, and their followers were thought to be on the Powder, Tongue, or Rosebud rivers. Crook's force consisted of 883 men, including ten companies of United States cavalry, and two companies of infantry, along with civilian packers, scouts, guides, and a newspaper reporter, Robert E. Strahorn of Denver's Rocky Mountain News. Crook's highly valued chief scout was Frank Grouard, who had lived among the Lakota and spoke their language.

== Cattle herd skirmish ==
In the early morning hours of March 3, 1876, north of Fort Fetterman, Indian warriors attacked the Big Horn Expedition's cattle herd, numbering over 200 animals. The two herders fired at the warriors, and the Indians fired back. One of the government civilian employees, cattle herder James Wright, was severely wounded by a bullet. The warriors then drove off and captured most of the cattle. Wright died of wounds received in the fight on March 28, 1876.

== March 4-5 ==
A blizzard on March 5 deposited over a foot of snow and significantly delayed Crook's progress. Temperatures fell so low that the thermometers could not record the cold. The soldiers had to heat their forks in the coals of fires to prevent the tines from freezing to their tongues. Crook's column slowly followed the Bozeman Trail north to Old Fort Reno, reaching it on March 5. The fort had been abandoned by the army eight years earlier. The expedition established its supply base near the abandoned post, and Crook ordered that the wagons be left at the depot. The infantry accompanying the column, Companies C and I of the 4th U.S. Infantry under the command of Captain Edwin M. Coates, would serve as the station's guard. That evening, the expedition camped on the east bank of the Powder River opposite the site of the fort.

== Fort Reno skirmish ==
By 8:00 p.m. on March 5, 1876, the soldiers' pickets were on duty and the camp was asleep when Sioux or Cheyenne warriors hiding near the east end of the camp suddenly fired on the infantry picket lines. The soldiers on guard answered their fire, but since the fighting started late at night, all either side could see were the flashes of gunfire. The sleeping camp quickly awoke, and many of the soldiers went toward the picket lines. In the firefight that ensued, Private James M. Slavey of Company I, 4th Infantry was wounded in the cheek by a bullet. The skirmish lasted for less than an hour. One aspect that made the engagement rare was that it was a night battle, which was not a common event during the American Indian Wars.

== March 6–16 ==
On March 6, the Bighorn expedition continued north, and on March 7 the five cavalry battalions set out toward the confluence of Prairie Dog Creek and the Tongue River. After reaching that point on March 12, the ten cavalry companies rode first down the Tongue, then to the headwaters of Otter Creek, reaching it on March 16. On the 16th, scout Frank Grouard spotted two Oglala Lakota warriors observing the soldiers. Because of this, Grouard believed that the Oglala Lakota camp of the war chief Crazy Horse might be nearby. This was reported to Crook, and at 5 p.m. on March 16, he divided his command and sent Colonel Joseph J. Reynolds (a West Point classmate of President Ulysses S. Grant and a combat veteran of both the Mexican–American War and Civil War) on a night march with about 384 men, supplying them with rations for one day. General Crook kept with him about 300 of the expedition's men and the pack train, with which he planned to rendezvous with Reynolds at the mouth of Lodge Pole Creek on the 17th. During the night Frank Grouard and the other scouts led Reynolds's advance and followed the two warriors' trail in the snow. That trail led to what the soldiers were looking for, a Cheyenne and Lakota Sioux village, which they described as containing more than 100 lodges on the west bank of Powder River. The scouts immediately reported this information back to Colonel Reynolds.

== Battle of Powder River ==
The village, however, was somewhat further north than anticipated, with the result that initially only Captain James Egan's 2nd Cavalry Company K, of 47 men, including Second Lieutenant John G. Bourke, charged into the village from the south, while the other companies were delayed by the distance and rough terrain. The soldiers were under fire for approximately five hours when, at about 2:30 p.m., with the destruction of the village complete, Reynolds ordered his soldiers to withdraw. Over 700 Indian ponies had been captured. In his premature haste to withdraw, the command left behind the bodies of its three dead soldiers, with one in the village and two at a field hospital. Also remaining was Private Lorenzo E. Ayers, who was badly wounded and subsequently killed by the Indians. The men made their way across to the east side of the frozen Powder River, withdrawing south.

Reynolds's command withdrew about 21 miles (34 km) south that afternoon and evening, crossing and recrossing the frozen Powder River when necessary, up the river to the confluence of the Powder and Lodge Pole Creek, arriving there after 9:00 p.m. in an exhausted condition. However, General Crook was not there as he had camped over 10 miles (16 km) to the northeast and had failed to inform Reynolds of his new location.

Although the Indians suffered only two to three killed and one to three wounded during the battle, they lost most of their property and in the words of the Cheyenne warrior Wooden Leg were "rendered very poor." The people walked several days to reach the Oglala Sioux village of Crazy Horse farther north near the Little Powder River, where they were given shelter and food. On the way, several Cheyenne people froze to death. The army stated that the village consisted of about 104 lodges, including tipis and wikiups, while Cheyenne accounts said the village had about 40-65 tipis and about 50 other structures. Therefore, around a hundred total structures made up the Indian village that day. The number of warriors involved in the battle numbered between 100 and 250, while there were about 384 U.S. soldiers and civilians present.

== March 18–26 ==
Early in the morning of March 18, the Cheyenne recaptured over 500 of their ponies, but Colonel Reynolds ordered his men not to pursue. At approximately 1:30 p.m. that day, Crook's command rejoined Reynolds with the pack train, and the six companies were finally able to collect their rations and blankets. The reunited column returned to the supply base at Old Fort Reno, where the wounded soldiers were placed in wagons, and Captain Coates's companies of the 4th Infantry rejoined the Big Horn Expedition after two weeks of separation. On March 26, 1876, the entire command, except for the four soldiers killed on March 17, returned to Fort Fetterman, Wyoming Territory, ending the 26-day campaign.

== Aftermath ==
The Big Horn Expedition's path covered over 410 miles (660 km) across five present-day counties in two states. The command suffered more than 79 casualties from various causes, including 4 killed, 8 wounded (1 mortally), 1 injured in an accident, and over 66 frostbitten. Colonel Reynolds was accused of dereliction of duty for failing to properly support the first charge at Powder River with his entire command; for burning the captured supplies, food, blankets, buffalo robes, and ammunition instead of keeping them for army use; and most of all, for losing hundreds of the captured horses. In January 1877, his court-martial at Cheyenne, Wyoming Territory found Reynolds guilty of all three charges. He was sentenced to suspension from rank and command for one year. Reynolds's friend and West Point classmate, President Ulysses S. Grant, remitted the sentence, but Reynolds never served again. He retired on disability leave on June 25, 1877, exactly one year after the culminating battle of the Great Sioux War at the Little Bighorn. Crook's and Reynolds' failed expedition and their inability to seriously damage the Lakota and Cheyenne may have encouraged Indian resistance to the demands of the United States.

== Casualties ==
Native Americans

Killed in action-

- Eagle Chief, Northern Cheyenne, March 17.
- Whirlwind, Northern Cheyenne, March 17.

Wounded in action-

- Braided Locks, Northern Cheyenne, March 17, "one cheek furrowed by a bullet".
- unknown warrior, Northern Cheyenne, March 17 "forearm badly shattered".

United States Army

Killed in action-

- Private George Schneider, Company K, 2nd Cavalry, March 17.
- Private Peter Dowdy, Company E, 3rd Cavalry, March 17.
- Private Michael I. McCannon, Company F, 3rd Cavalry, March 17.
- Private Lorenzo E. Ayers, Company M, 3rd Cavalry, March 17.

Mortally wounded-

- Cattle Herder James Wright, mortally wounded March 3, died of wounds March 28.

Wounded in action-

- Private James M. Slavey, Company I, 4th Infantry, March 5.
- First Lieutenant William C. Rawolle, Company E, 2nd Cavalry, March 17.
- Sergeant Charles Kaminski, Company M, 3rd Cavalry, March 17.
- Corporal John Lang, Company E, 2nd Cavalry, March 17.
- Farrier Patrick Goings, Company K, 2nd Cavalry, March 17.
- Private John Droege, Company K, 2nd Cavalry, March 17.
- Private Edward Eagan, Company K, 2nd Cavalry, March 17.

Injured-

- Corporal John H. Moore, Company D, 3rd Cavalry, March 9, crushed by horse and severely injured

Frostbitten-

- Second Lieutenant John G. Bourke, Aide-de-camp to General George Crook, 3rd Cavalry
- 65 additional soldiers

== Orders of battle ==
Native Americans, Chief's Two Moons, He Dog, Little Coyote (Little Wolf), and Old Bear. Between 100 and 250 warriors.

Native Americans	Tribe	Leaders
Native Americans	Northern Cheyenne	Two Moons; Little Coyote (Little Wolf); Wooden Leg; Old Bear; Maple Tree; White Bull (Ice Bear), (Ice); Kate Bighead, sister of Ice; Bear-Walks-on-a-Ridge; Powder Face; Yellow Eagle; Bull Coming Behind; Tall Sioux; Eagle Chief †; Whirlwind †
Native Americans	Lakota Sioux	He Dog; Short Bull brother of He Dog; Rock (Inyan) wife of He Dog; Crawler

United States Army

Big Horn Expedition, March 1–26, 1876, Brigadier General George R. Crook and Colonel Joseph J. Reynolds, commanding.

Big Horn Expedition	Battalion	Companies and Others
Brigadier General George Crook, commanding	1st Battalion Captain Anson Mills	Company E, 3rd Cavalry: First Lieutenant John B. Johnson; Company M, 3rd Cavalry: Captain Anson Mills, First Lieutenant Augustus C. Paul
Brigadier General George Crook, commanding	2nd Battalion Captain William Hawley	Company A, 3rd Cavalry: Captain William Hawley, First Lieutenant Joseph Lawson, Second Lieutenant Charles Morton, Detached as adjutant; Company D, 3rd Cavalry: First Lieutenant William W. Robinson, Jr., Detached from Company H
Brigadier General George Crook, commanding	3rd Battalion Captain Henry E. Noyes	Company I, 2nd Cavalry: Captain Henry E. Noyes, First Lieutenant Christopher T. Hall; Company K, 2nd Cavalry: Captain James Egan
Brigadier General George Crook, commanding	4th Battalion Captain Thomas B. Dewees	Company A, 2nd Cavalry: Captain Thomas B. Dewees, First Lieutenant Martin E. O'Brien, Second Lieutenant Daniel C. Pearson; Company B, 2nd Cavalry: Captain James T. Peale, Second Lieutenant Frank U. Robinson
Brigadier General George Crook, commanding	5th Battalion Captain Alexander Moore	Company E, 2nd Cavalry: First Lieutenant William C. Rawolle, Detached from Company B, (Wounded), Second Lieutenant Frederick W. Sibley; Company F, 3rd Cavalry: Captain Alexander Moore, Second Lieutenant Bainbridge Reynolds
Brigadier General George Crook, commanding	6th Battalion Captain Edwin M. Coates	Company C, 4th Infantry: Captain Edwin M. Coates; Company I, 4th Infantry: Captain Samuel P. Ferris, Second Lieutenant Charles W. Mason
Brigadier General George Crook, commanding	Pack Train Thomas Moore, Chief Packer	Thomas McAuliff, 1st Battalion Pack Train; Richard "Uncle Dick" Closter (Kloster), 2nd Battalion Pack Train; Mr. Foster, 3rd Battalion Pack Train; Mr. Young, 4th Battalion Pack Train; Edward DeLaney, 5th Battalion Pack Train
Brigadier General George Crook, commanding	Medical Detachment Assistant Surgeon Curtis E. Munn	Assistant Surgeon Curtis E. Munn; Acting Assistant Surgeon Charles R. Stephens; Acting Assistant Surgeon John Ridgely; Hospital Steward William C. Bryan
Brigadier General George Crook, commanding	Scouts and Guides Major Thaddeus H. Stanton	First Lieutenant George A. Drew, Acting Assistant Quartermaster and Acting Chief of Subsistence, 3rd Cavalry; Second Lieutenant John G. Bourke, Aide-de-camp to General George Crook, 3rd Cavalry; Second Lieutenant Charles Morton, Acting Regimental Adjutant, 3rd Cavalry; Robert E. Strahorn, newspaper correspondent for the Rocky Mountain News; Benjamin H. Clark, guide; Frank Grouard, guide/interpreter; Louis Richard (Reshaw), guide/interpreter; Charles Richard (Reshaw), scout; Jack Russell (Buckskin Jack), scout; Baptiste Pourier (Big Bat), scout; Baptiste Garnier (Little Bat), scout; Charlie Jennesse, scout; John Shangreau, scout; Louis Shangreau, scout; Charles O'Donnell, scout; John Forbes, scout; Thomas Reed, scout; Felix Conasty, scout; John B. Provost, scout; Joseph Eldridge, scout; Henry Lewis, scout; Richard Seymour, scout; Benjamin Rowland, scout; William Crabbs, scout; Louis Archambeau, scout; David Madden, scout; James Murray, scout; John Farnham, scout; James B. McHugh, scout; Edward LaJeunesse, scout; M. W. Farley, scout; Thomas E. Newcombe, scout; P. Harvey, scout; Jules Ecoffey, scout; Matthew H. Merand, scout; Charles D. Brown, scout; Speed Stagnier, scout/guide; George Young, courier; John Wright †, cattle herder

United States Army, Colonel Joseph J. Reynolds, 3rd United States Cavalry Regiment, in command. Brigadier General George Crook following as an observer.

- 2nd United States Cavalry Regiment.
  - Company A, First Lieutenant Daniel C. Pearson.
  - Company B, Captain James T. Peale.
  - Company E, 53 men, First Lieutenant William C. Rawolle.
  - Company I, 56 men, Captain Henry E. Noyes.
  - Company K, 47 men, Captain James Egan.
- 3rd United States Cavalry Regiment.
  - Staff, 3 men, First Lieutenant George A. Drew, Second Lieutenant Charles Morton, Second Lieutenant John G. Bourke
  - Company A, First Lieutenant Joseph Lawson.
  - Company D, First Lieutenant William W. Robinson, Jr. (Detached from Co. H)
  - Company E, 69 men, First Lieutenant John B. Johnson.
  - Company F, 68 men, Captain Alexander Moore.
  - Company M, 68 men, Captain Anson Mills.
- 4th United States Infantry Regiment.
  - Company C, Captain Edwin M. Coates.
  - Company I, Captain Samuel P. Ferris.
- Scouts, Guides, Herders, Packers, Wagoners, Ambulance Employees, Unattached Soldiers, and Civilians, 191 men.
- Commissioned Officers......................................30
- Enlisted Soldiers..............................................662
- Scouts, Guides, Herders...................................35
- 5 Pack Trains, Chief Packer and employees....62
- Wagon Train employees...................................89
- Ambulance employees........................................5
- Aggregate......................................................883 men

== Officers of the expedition ==
- Brigadier General George R. Crook, Commander, Department of the Platte
- Colonel Joseph Jones Reynolds, Field and Staff, 3rd Cavalry
- Major Thaddeus Harlan Stanton, Paymaster, Chief of Scouts
- Assistant Surgeon Curtis Emerson Munn, Medical Service, Department of the Platte
- Acting Assistant Surgeon Charles R. Stephens, Medical Service, Department of the Platte
- Acting Assistant Surgeon John Ridgely, Medical Service, Department of the Platte
- Captain Anson Mills, Company M, 3rd Cavalry, Commander, 1st Battalion
- Captain William Hawley, Company A, 3rd Cavalry, Commander, 2nd Battalion
- Captain Henry Erastus Noyes, Company I, 2nd Cavalry, Commander, 3rd Battalion
- Captain Thomas Bull Dewees, Company A, 2nd Cavalry, Commander, 4th Battalion
- Captain Alexander Moore, Company F, 3rd Cavalry, Commander, 5th Battalion
- Captain Edwin Mortimer Coates, Company C, 4th Infantry, Commander, 6th Battalion
- Captain Samuel Peter Ferris, Company I, 4th Infantry
- Captain James Thomson Peale, Company B, 2nd Cavalry
- Captain James Ross "Teddy" Egan, Company K, 2nd Cavalry
- First Lieutenant George Augustus Drew, Acting Assistant Quartermaster and Acting Chief of Subsistence, 3rd Cavalry
- First Lieutenant William Charles Rawolle (wounded), Company E, 2nd Cavalry
- First Lieutenant Martin Edward O'Brien, Company A, 2nd Cavalry
- First Lieutenant Christopher Tomkins Hall, Company I, 2nd Cavalry
- First Lieutenant Joseph Lawson, Company A, 3rd Cavalry
- First Lieutenant William Wallace Robinson, Jr., Company D, 3rd Cavalry
- First Lieutenant John Burgess Johnson, Company E, 3rd Cavalry
- First Lieutenant Augustus Chouteau Paul, Company M, 3rd Cavalry
- Second Lieutenant John Gregory Bourke, Aide-de-camp to General George Crook, Company L, 3rd Cavalry
- Second Lieutenant Charles Morton, Acting Regimental Adjutant, Company A, 3rd Cavalry
- Second Lieutenant Charles Winder Mason, Company I, 4th Infantry
- Second Lieutenant Daniel Crosby Pearson, Company A, 2nd Cavalry
- Second Lieutenant Frank Upham Robinson
- Second Lieutenant Frederick William Sibley, Company E, 2nd Cavalry
- Second Lieutenant Joseph Lawson, Company A, 3rd Cavalry
- Second Lieutenant Bainbridge Reynolds, Company F, 3rd Cavalry

== In popular culture ==
In 1951, Hollywood produced a fictional movie loosely based upon the Battle of Powder River of the Big Horn Expedition, starring Van Heflin, Yvonne De Carlo, Jack Oakie, and Rock Hudson. The movie was released in the United States under the name Tomahawk and entitled Battle of Powder River in the United Kingdom and elsewhere.
