= Henry E. Noyes =

19th c. American general

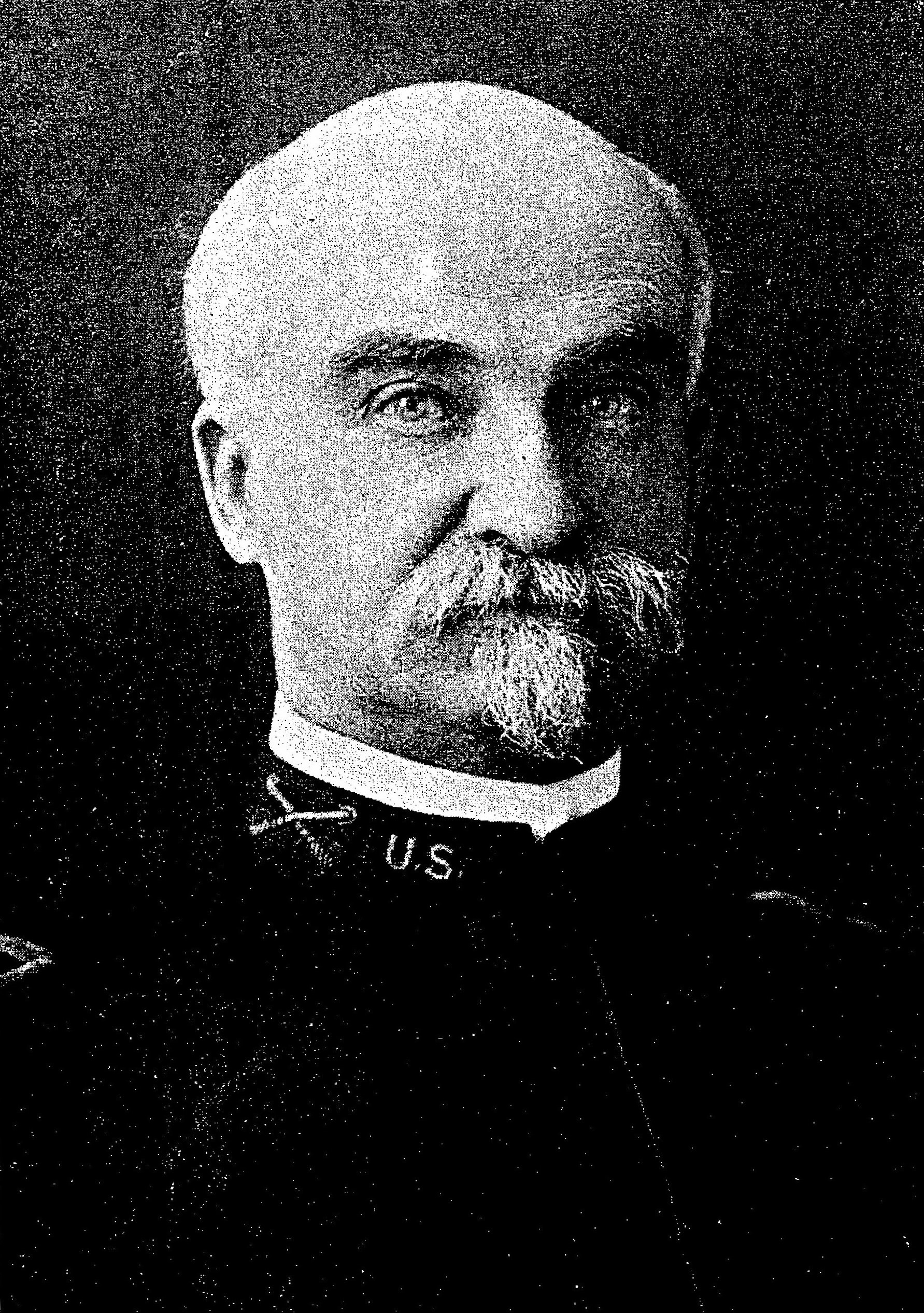
- Born: August 23, 1839; Belfast, Maine, US
- Died: July 13, 1919 (aged 79); Berkeley, California, US
- Burial place: San Francisco National Cemetery
- Military career
- Allegiance: United States of America; Union
- Branch: United States Army; Union Army
- Service years: 1861–1901
- Rank: Brigadier General (USA)
- Units: 2nd U.S. Dragoon Regiment; 4th U.S. Cavalry Regiment; 5th U.S. Cavalry Regiment
- Commands: 3rd Battalion, Big Horn Expedition; 2nd U.S. Cavalry Regiment; U.S. Cavalry Brigade
- Conflicts: American Civil War; Manassas campaign; Battle of Blackburn's Ford; First Battle of Bull Run; Battle of Secessionville; Maryland Campaign; Battle of South Mountain; Battle of Antietam; Battle of Fredericksburg; Gettysburg campaign; Battle of Brandy Station; Battle of Hagerstown; Third Battle of Winchester; Battle of Nashville; Wilson's Raid; Battle of Selma; American Indian Wars; Sioux Wars; Big Horn Expedition; Fort Reno Skirmish; Battle of Powder River; Great Sioux War of 1876; Battle of Prairie Dog Creek; Battle of Rosebud; Spanish–American War

Henry Erastus Noyes (August 23, 1839 – July 13, 1919) was a United States Army Officer who served during the American Civil War, American Indian Wars and Spanish–American War.

== Biography ==
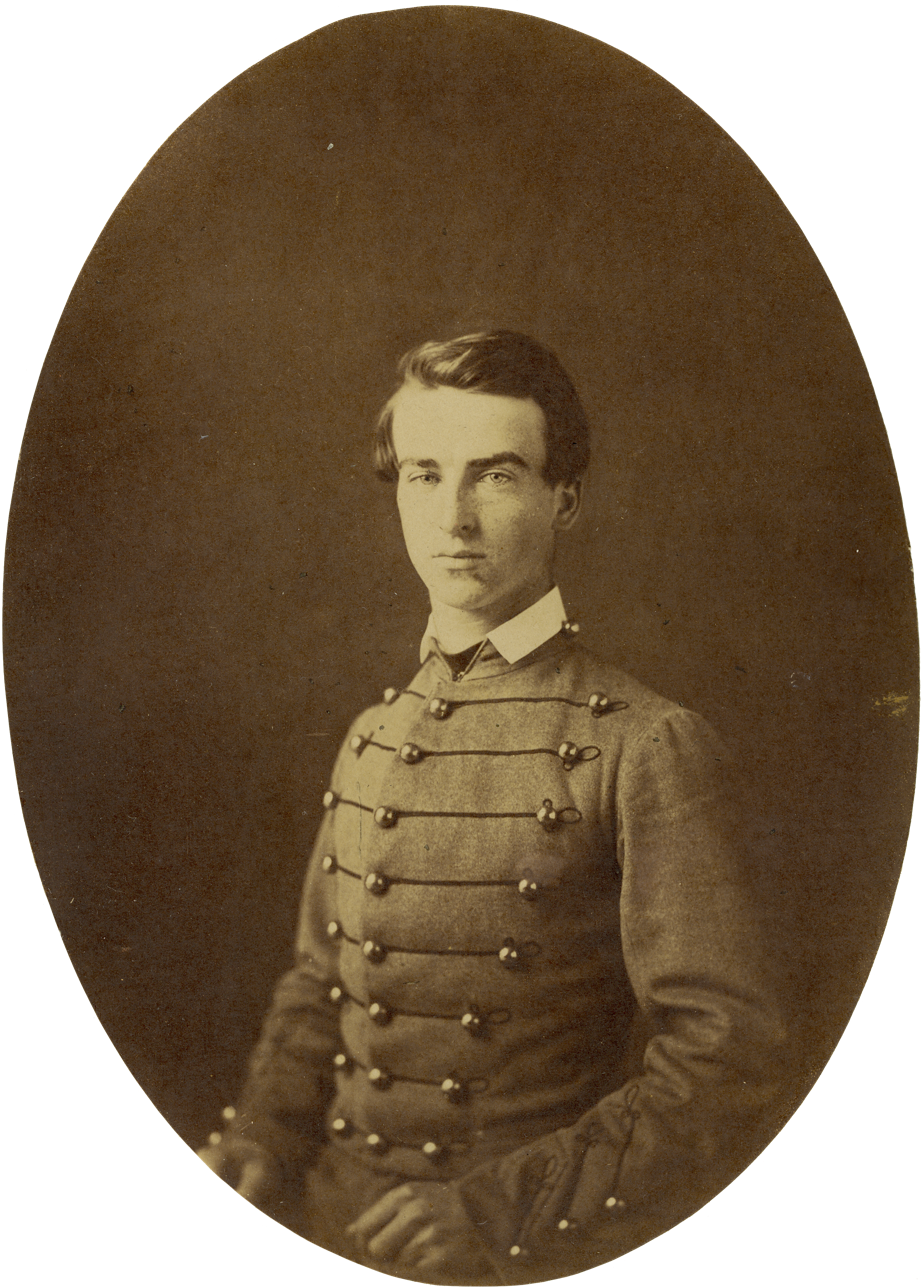
Noyes in West Point

Henry E. Noyes was born in Belfast, Maine. He was appointed from Massachusetts to the United States Military Academy at West Point, and was a Cadet there from July 1, 1857, to June 24, 1861, when he was graduated and promoted in the Army to brevet second lieutenant, 2nd Dragoons on June 24, 1861. The regiment was redesignated the 2nd U.S. Cavalry on August 3, 1861.

== Civil War Service ==
Noyes entered service during the American Civil War. He served in the defenses of Washington, D. C., from June 27 to July 16, 1861, and in the Manassas Campaign of July 1861. He fought at the Battle of Blackburn's Ford on July 18, 1861, and the Battle of Bull Run on July 21, 1861. Noyes then served in the defenses of Washington, D. C., from July to September 1861, the Port Royal Expedition of October to November 1861, and the Florida Expedition which captured Fernandina, Jacksonville, and St. Augustine from February to June 1862. Henry E. Noyes was promoted to first lieutenant, 2nd Cavalry on February 15, 1862, and was in the Battle of Secessionville on James Island, South Carolina on June 16, 1862, and at Hilton Head, South Carolina from June 18 to August 27, 1862. He then served in the Maryland Campaign at the headquarters of the Army of the Potomac from September to November 1862, being present at the Battle of South Mountain on September 14, 1862, the Battle of Antietam on September 17, 1862, and on the March to Falmouth, Virginia from October‑November 1862. Noyes then served in the Fredericksburg and Rappahannock Campaigns of the Army of the Potomac from December 1862 to June 1863, being engaged in Stoneman's Raid toward Richmond from April 13 to May 9, 1863, and in combat in the Battle of Brandy Station at Beverly's Ford on June 9, 1863. Noyes went on a sick leave of absence from June 13 to July 1863 before returning to the Army during the Gettysburg campaign of the Army of the Potomac in July 1863, being engaged in skirmishes near Boonsborough, Hagerstown, and Williamsport. Noyes was then sick in a hospital at Frederick, Maryland in July 1863 before returning to the Army on the Rappahannock. Noyes was promoted to brevet captain on August 1, 1863, for "Gallant and Meritorious Services" at the Battle of Brandy Station, Virginia. He continued service in the Army of the Potomac in August 1863, being engaged in several skirmishes, and was at Camp Buford, Washington, D.C., remounting and equipping his company from August to October 1863. Noyes was on sick leave of absence from October 13 to December 27, 1863, and on mustering and disbursing duty for the Draft Rendezvous at Riker and Hart Islands, New York from December 7, 1863, to July 15, 1864. He was appointed Aide-de‑Camp to Brigadier General James H. Wilson and served in that capacity from July 20 to October 5, 1864. Noyes was in operations before Petersburg from July 20 to August 5, 1864, in the Shenandoah Valley Campaign from August 17 to October 5, 1864, and was engaged in skirmishes at Summit Point on August 21, 1864, at Kearneysville on August 25, 1864, the Third Battle of Winchester or Battle of Opequan on September 19, 1864, and skirmishes at Front Royal on September 21, Milford on September 22, and Waynesborough on September 29, 1864. Noyes was on leave of absence from October 5‑26, 1864 as Acting Assistant Inspector General of the Cavalry Corps, Military Division of the Mississippi from October 26, 1864, to October 1865, being engaged in the Battle of Nashville on December 15‑16, 1864 and in the pursuit of the enemy, skirmishing with the Confederate rear guard in December 1864. He was promoted to captain, 2nd Cavalry on January 25, 1865, and served in General Wilson's Expedition into Alabama and Georgia from March to April 1865, participating in the assault on and capture of Selma on April 2, 1865. Noyes was brevetted major retroactive to April 2, 1865, for "Gallant and Meritorious Services" at the Capture of Selma, Alabama. On May 7, 1865, Noyes, in command of a detachment of the 4th U.S. Cavalry, arrested Confederate Captain Henry Wirz, the commandant of the infamous Andersonville Prison in Georgia. Wirz was later tried and executed for conspiracy and murder, making him the highest-ranking Confederate to be sentenced to death for crimes during their service.

== Service in the West ==
Noyes served on frontier duty at Fort Leavenworth, Kansas from November 1865 to June 1866, at Fort Riley, Kansas from June 1866 to March 13, 1867, at Fort Laramie, Dakota Territory from May 1 to November 1867, and at the newly established Fort D. A. Russell, Dakota Territory from November 17, 1867, to June 1868, during which time he was on a leave of absence from December 15, 1867, to March 28, 1868. He served at Fort McPherson, Nebraska from July 1868 to May 1869 and in the field to November 1869, at Omaha Barracks, Nebraska to April 1870, and at Medicine Bow, Nebraska until November 1870. Noyes was stationed at Fort Sanders, Wyoming Territory until March 1874, during which time he escorted engineers making a reconnaissance of northwestern Wyoming from June 4 to September 27, 1873. He returned to Fort Laramie from March to October 1874 before again being stationed at Fort Sanders until May 3, 1875. Noyes went on a leave of absence from May 3 to July 23, 1875, and then was a witness before civil court until September 2, 1875. He returned to frontier duty and was assigned to Fort Laramie from October 1875 until early 1876, when he was ordered to move his Company I of the 2nd Cavalry to Fort Fetterman, Wyoming Territory, in order to participate in the Big Horn Expedition of March 1–27, 1876. During this campaign, Noyes was given command of the 3rd Battalion, consisting of Companies I and K of the 2nd U.S. Cavalry at the Battle of Powder River in Montana Territory. Upon returning to Fort Laramie, Noyes would be court-martialed for his actions during the battle in unsaddling his company and therefore rendering it unable to support the remainder of the command fighting in the village. He was found guilty on May 2 but allowed to rejoin his regiment and command a five-company battalion of the 2nd Cavalry during the Big Horn and Yellowstone Expedition from May 23 to October 28, 1876, being engaged in the Battle of Prairie Dog Creek on June 9 and the Battle of Rosebud on June 17, 1876. Noyes was posted to Fort D. A. Russell from November 8, 1876, to January 13, 1877, at Fort Fred Steele from January 14 to September 23, 1877, and at the newly established Fort Keogh, Montana Territory from October 24, 1877, to August 15, 1878, during which time he was on a leave of absence from March 14 to April 25, 1878. Noyes served on Mounted Recruiting Service from October 1878 to September 30, 1879, and was promoted major, 4th Cavalry effective June 14, 1879. He was in command of a battalion at Fort Garland, California from December 1, 1879, to March 12, 1880, of Fort Hays, Kansas until May 30, 1880, of a battalion in the field in New Mexico Territory until November 6, 1880, and again of Fort Hays, Kansas until July 20, 1881. Noyes was transferred to Fort Elliott, Texas until November 1881, to Fort Craig, New Mexico Territory to March 27, 1883, in command of a battalion in the field until April 8, 1883, again at Fort Craig until June 28, 1883, and at Fort Wingate, New Mexico Territory to June 13, 1884. He was in command of Fort McDowell, Arizona Territory until June 1886, stationed at Tucson, Arizona until October 1886, in command of Fort Lowell, Arizona until November 30, 1888, and at Fort Bowie until July 1890. Major Noyes was then transferred to the northwest, serving at Fort Walla Walla, Washington until August 1890, and at Boisé Barracks, Idaho on July 1, 1891. He was promoted to Lieutenant Colonel of the 5th Cavalry on July 1, 1891, and served in that capacity at Fort Supply, Indian Territory from November 1891 to August 1892 before being transferred to his old regiment, the 2nd Cavalry, on August 12, 1892. Noyes served with the 2nd at Fort Huachuca, Arizona until August 1893, at Fort Wingate, New Mexico until September 1894, at Fort Logan, Colorado, until November 1895, and again at Fort Wingate until April 17, 1898. Lieutenant Colonel Noyes was serving there when the Spanish American War broke out in the spring of 1898.

== Later Service and Death ==
Noyes was ordered with his regiment to Camp Thomas, located on the Chickamauga battlefield in Georgia, and served there until April 22, 1898, when they were ordered to Mobile, Alabama. He was then promoted colonel of the 2nd Cavalry on May 31, 1898, and was in command of the regiment at Mobile until June 3, 1898. Noyes was given command of a cavalry brigade at Tampa, Florida, and was stationed there from June 6—August 1898. He commanded a cavalry brigade at Camp Wikoff on Long Island, New York, until September 22, 1898, and commanded a cavalry brigade at Camp Forse, Alabama, from December 25, 1898, to February 13, 1899. Noyes embarked for Cuba, and was in camp at Cienfuegos, Cuba, from February 22, 1899, to May 1899, at Santa Clara, Cuba, to July 1899, and at Matanzas, Cuba, until November 1901. Colonel Henry E. Noyes retired on November 16, 1901, at 62 years of age, and was subsequently promoted to brigadier general on the Retired List on April 23, 1904.

Noyes moved to Berkeley, California in 1904. He died at his home in Berkeley on July 13, 1919, at the age of 79 and is buried in San Francisco National Cemetery.

== See also ==
Category:People of Maine in the American Civil War
