= Strahorn =

Strahorn is a surname. Notable people with the surname include:

- Carrie Adell Strahorn (1854–1925), American explorer and pioneer
- Fred Strahorn (born 1965), American politician

== See also ==
- Strayhorn (disambiguation)
