= Jeremiah Murphy =

Jeremiah Murphy may refer to:

- Jeremiah Henry Murphy (1835–1893), member of the U.S. House of Representatives from Iowa, 1883–1887
- Jeremiah Murphy (piper) (fl. 1811–15), Irish piper
- Jeremiah J. Murphy (1858–1932), United States Army soldier and Medal of Honor recipient
- Jerry Murphy (Jeremiah Michael Murphy, born 1959), retired English footballer
- Jeremiah C. Murphy (1875–1925), Alaska Attorney General, 1919–1920
- Jeremiah V. Murphy (1927-2005), columnist for The Boston Globe
