= Battle of Powder River =

1876 battle of the Big Horn Expedition

- Part of the Big Horn Expedition, Great Sioux War of 1876
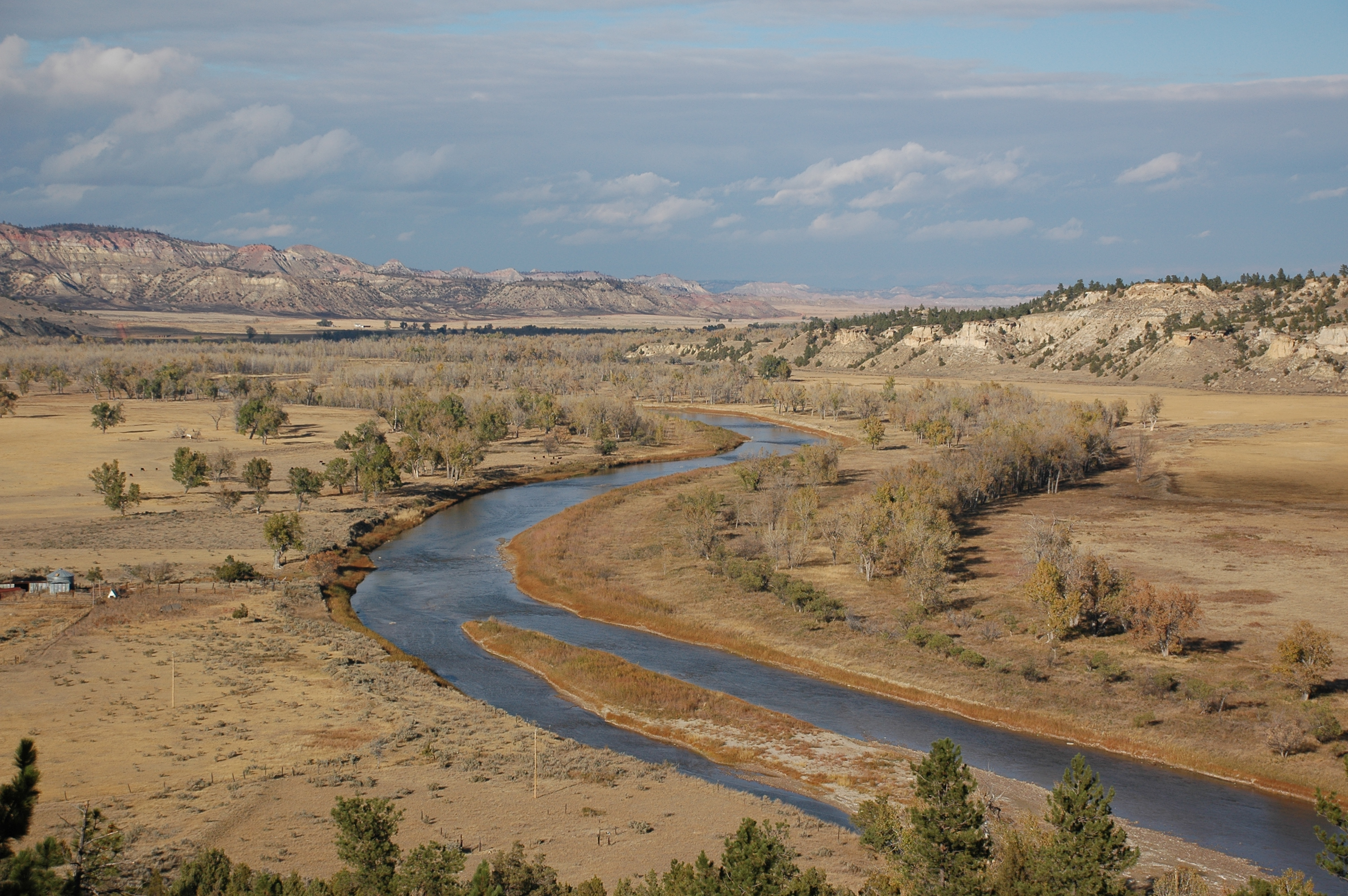
- The Powder River looking north on the battlefield
Date	March 17, 1876 (150 years ago)
Location	Powder River, Montana Territory 45 05 18 N 105 51 28 W Southwest of Broadus in present-day Powder River County, Montana
Result	Northern Cheyenne/Oglala Lakota victory

Belligerents
Northern Cheyenne; Oglala Lakota Sioux	United States

Commanders and leaders
Two Moon; He Dog; Little Wolf; Wooden Leg	(United States) Joseph J. Reynolds (United States) Anson Mills (United States) Henry E. Noyes (United States) Alexander Moore

Strength
100–250	384

Casualties and losses
3 killed, several people later died of exposure 3 wounded	4 killed 6 wounded 66 frostbitten

The Battle of Powder River, also known as the Reynolds Battle, occurred on March 17, 1876, in Montana Territory, United States, as part of the Big Horn Expedition. The attack on a Northern Cheyenne and Oglala Lakota Indian encampment by Colonel Joseph J. Reynolds initiated the Great Sioux War of 1876. Although destroying a large amount of Indian property, the attack was poorly carried out and solidified Northern Cheyenne and Lakota Sioux resistance to the U.S. attempt to force them to sell the Black Hills and live on a reservation.

== Background ==
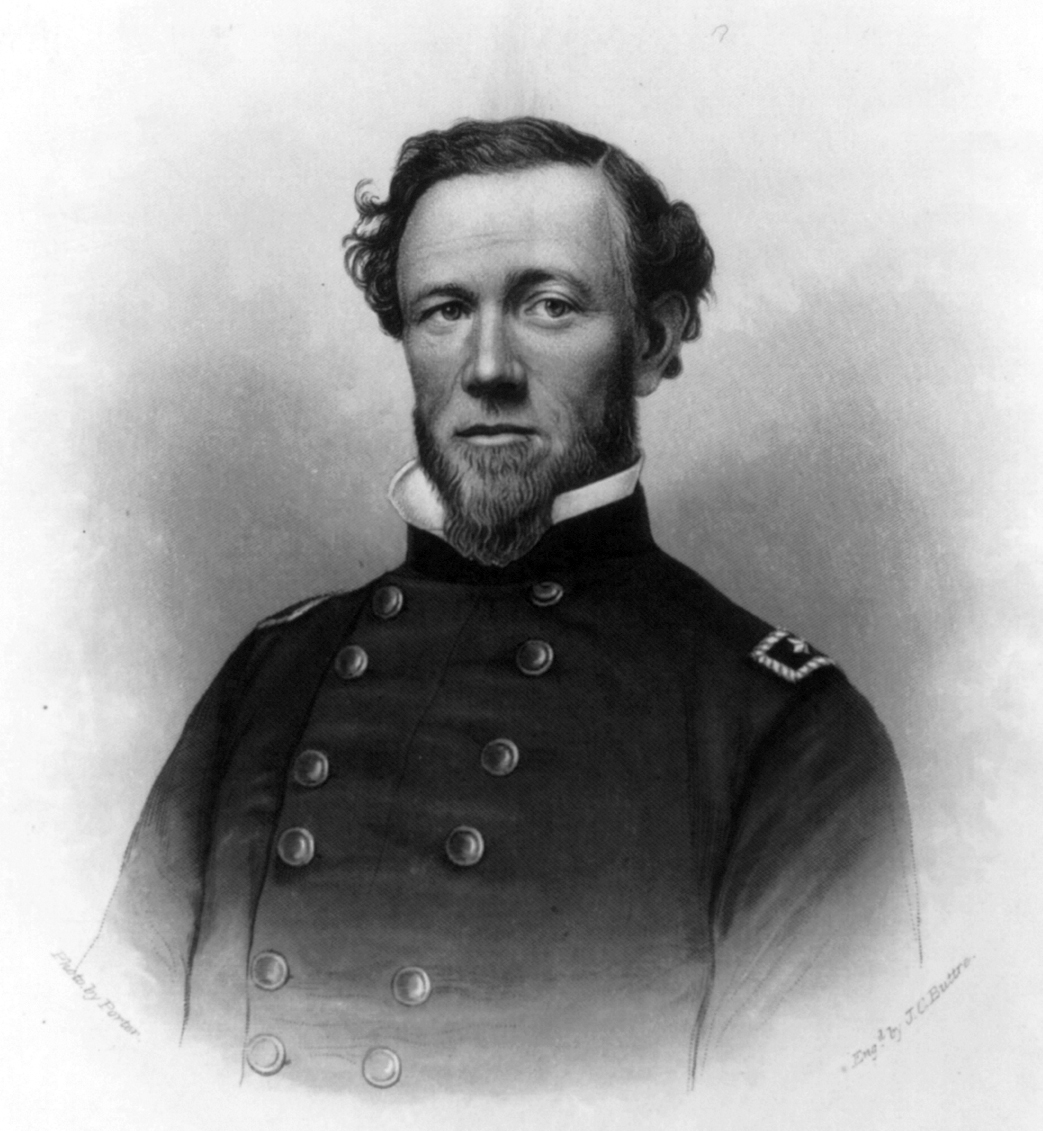
Brevet Major General, Colonel Joseph Jones Reynolds

The Treaty of Fort Laramie (1868) granted the Lakota Sioux and their northern Cheyenne allies a reservation, including the Black Hills, in Dakota Territory and a large area of "unceded territory" in what became Montana and Wyoming. Both areas were for the exclusive use of the Indians, and whites, except for government officials, were forbidden to trespass. In 1874, the discovery of gold in the Black Hills caused the United States to attempt to buy the Black Hills from the Sioux. The U.S. ordered all bands of Lakota and Cheyenne to come to the Indian agencies on the reservation by January 31, 1876, to negotiate the sale. Some of the bands did not comply and when the deadline of January 31 passed, the Commissioner of Indian Affairs, John Q. Smith, wrote that "without the receipt of any news of Sitting Bull's submission, I see no reason why... military operations against him should not commence at once." On February 8, 1876, General Philip Sheridan telegraphed Generals George R. Crook and Alfred Howe Terry, ordering them to undertake winter campaigns against the "hostiles."

In bitterly cold weather, Brigadier General George Crook, commander of the Department of the Platte, marched north with the Big Horn Expedition from Fort Fetterman near present-day Douglas, Wyoming, on March 1. General Crook's objective was to strike against the Indians while they were at their most vulnerable in winter camps. Sitting Bull, Crazy Horse, and their followers were thought to be on the Powder, Tongue, or Rosebud rivers. Crook's force consisted of 883 men, including United States Cavalry and Infantry, civilian packers, scouts, guides, and a newspaper reporter. Crook's highly valued chief scout was Frank Grouard, who had lived among the Lakota and spoke their language.

The soldiers had to heat their forks in the coals of their fires to prevent the tines from freezing to their tongues. A blizzard on March 5 deposited over a foot of snow and significantly delayed Crook's progress. Temperatures fell so low that the thermometers of the day could not record the cold. Crook's column slowly followed the Bozeman Trail north to Old Fort Reno, reaching it on March 5. There, the expedition established its supply base, leaving the wagons and Infantry accompanying the column, Companies C, and I, of the 4th U.S. Infantry, under Captain Edwin M. Coates. The five Cavalry battalions then marched to the head of Otter Creek. On March 16, scout Frank Grouard saw two Indian warriors observing the soldiers. He identified them as Oglala Lakota and believed that the camp of Crazy Horse might be nearby. This was reported to Crook, and at 5 p.m. he divided his command and sent Colonel Joseph J. Reynolds (a West Point classmate of President Ulysses S. Grant, and a combat veteran of both the Mexican–American War, and Civil War) on a night march with about 384 men, with rations for one day, following the trail of the two Oglalas southeast toward Powder River. Crook kept with him about 300 men. That night Frank Grouard and the other scouts followed the two Oglala Sioux's trail in the snow. It led right to what they were looking for, an Indian village, which they described as containing more than 100 lodges on the west bank of Powder River. The scouts immediately reported this information back to Colonel Reynolds.

== Plan of attack ==
In frigid weather, Reynolds' plan was for one battalion, Companies I and K of the 2nd U.S. Cavalry under the command of Captain Henry E. Noyes, to descend the steep hills south of where the second field hospital would be established to the valley floor. One company, (K) under Captain James R. Egan, was to attack the southern end of the village. The other company (I), under Captain Noyes, was to capture the Indian pony herd estimated at 1,000 animals, grazing and spread out through the valley on both sides of the river. A second battalion, Companies E and M of the 3rd U.S. Cavalry under the command of Captain Anson Mills, was to attack the village simultaneously from the west, and the remaining Cavalry battalion, Company E of the 2nd U.S. Cavalry and Company F of the 3rd U.S. Cavalry under the command of Captain Alexander Moore, was to occupy the ridges north and west of the village to prevent the Indians from escaping in that direction.

== Battle ==
The village, however, was further north than anticipated, with the result that only Captain James R. Egan's 2nd Cavalry Company K of 47 men, accompanied by Second Lieutenant John G. Bourke and newspaper reporter Robert E. Strahorn, charged into the village from the south, while the other companies were delayed by the distance and rough terrain.

According to Captain Egan's watch, the battle began at 9:05 a.m. on the morning of Friday, March 17. The Indians, now identified as Northern Cheyenne and a few Oglala Sioux, were surprised. Wooden Leg, an eighteen-year-old Cheyenne warrior in the village remembered the attack: "Women screamed. Children cried for their mothers. Old people tottered and hobbled away to get out of reach of the bullets singing among the lodges. Braves seized whatever weapons they had and tried to meet the attack."

The Cheyennes hurried their women and children to shelter while retreating northward out of the village, then took positions on the bluffs overlooking the village. They then directed fire toward the soldiers now in the village. Several cavalrymen of Company K, 2nd Cavalry were wounded early in the battle and a number of the company's horses were killed or wounded. Captain Egan was reinforced in the village by several more companies. When Colonel Reynolds arrived, the soldiers were still under fire. He ordered everything in the village destroyed, including dried buffalo meat. During this time, Privates Peter Dowdy of Company E, 3rd Cavalry and George Schneider of Company K, 2nd Cavalry were killed. The village and supplies proved difficult to burn, and when fire reached the gunpowder and ammunition stored in the tipis, they exploded. First Lieutenant John Gregory Bourke, General Crook's aide-de-camp, commented on the richness of the goods in the village: "bales of fur, buffalo robes, and hides decorated with porcupine quills". Some soldiers went against orders and took buffalo robes from the village, as they were freezing. Bourke later estimated that 66 men suffered from frostbite, including himself.

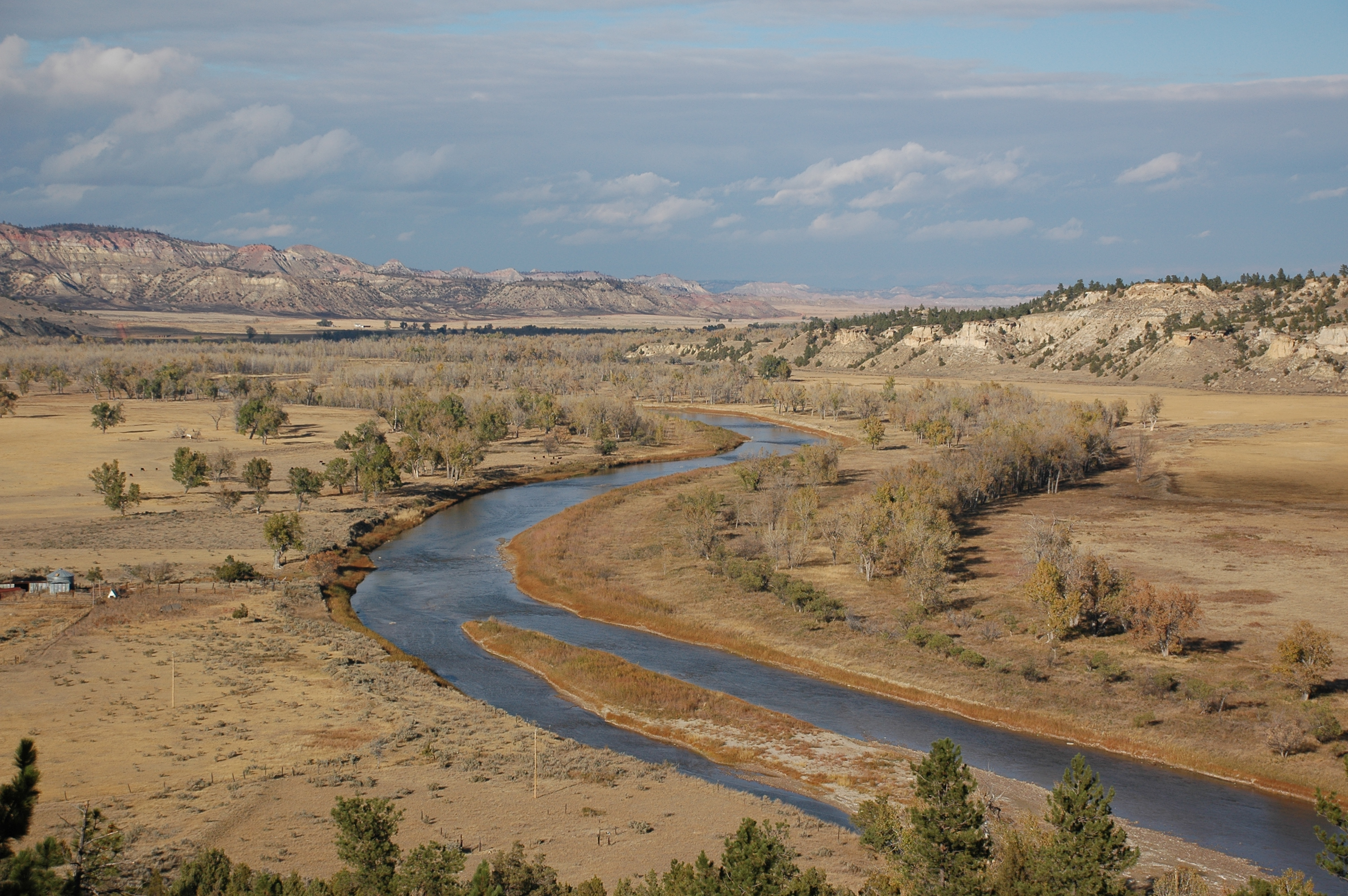
The Indian village area is slightly west (left) of the upper left side of the photo. Company I, 2nd Cavalry gathered Indian ponies on both sides of the river, and the surviving soldiers withdrew from the battlefield across the frozen stream from left to right. Photograph taken from hospital bluff looking north, October 16, 2012.

Throughout the day, soldiers gathered in over 700 Indian ponies. The battle had lasted five hours when, at approximately 2:00 p.m., with the destruction of the village complete, Reynolds ordered his soldiers to withdraw, and the men made their way across to the east side of the frozen Powder River. Private Michael I. McCannon of Company F, 3rd Cavalry was killed around this time. During the retreat, Private Lorenzo E. Ayers of Company M, 3rd Cavalry, was seriously wounded in his right arm and leg, and was left behind in the Indian village. Although saddler Jeremiah J. Murphy of Company F, and blacksmith Albert Glawinski of Company M, 3rd Cavalry attempted to rescue Ayers, he was subsequently "cut limb to limb" by vengeful Indians. By the end of the battle, four soldiers had been killed and six wounded. For their actions, Jeremiah J. Murphy and Albert Glawinski would later be awarded the Congressional Medal of Honor on October 16, 1877. Hospital Steward William C. Bryan would also be awarded the Medal of Honor for his actions in the battle.

The last action of the battle took place about 1 mile (1.6 km) south of Hospital bluff, when First Lieutenant William C. Rawolle, commanding the rear guard, Company E, 2nd Cavalry, dismounted eight of his men in a defensive skirmish line. Lieutenant Rawolle's line remained in place for only a short time, although First Sergeant William Land reported that during this time he shot an Indian warrior from his horse. In Reynolds' premature haste to withdraw, he left behind the bodies of three dead soldiers, with one in the village, and two at the second field Hospital as well as the badly wounded Private Ayers. The soldiers withdrew approximately 21 miles (34 km) south that afternoon and evening, crossing and recrossing the frozen Powder River as needed, up the river to the confluence of the Powder River and Lodge Pole Creek (now called Clear Creek), arriving there after 9:00 p.m. in an exhausted condition. However, General Crook with the other four companies and the pack train was not there, as he had camped ten miles to the northeast and had failed to inform Colonel Reynolds of his location.

The Cheyenne recaptured over 500 of their horses the next morning, March 18, as no guards for them had been posted. It was not until approximately 1:30 p.m. that day that Reynolds finally rendezvoused with General Crook. The reunited column returned to Fort Fetterman, Wyoming Territory, arriving on March 26, 1876.

Although the Cheyenne and Lakota only suffered several warriors killed, and two to three wounded during the battle, they lost most of their property, and in the words of the warrior Wooden Leg: "The Cheyennes were rendered very poor. I had nothing left but the clothing I had on ... My eagle wing bone flute, my medicine pipe, my rifle, everything else of mine, were gone." The women and children walked several days to reach the Oglala Sioux village of Crazy Horse farther north near the Little Powder River, where they were given shelter and food. On the way, several Cheyennes froze to death. The army stated that the village consisted of about 104 lodges, including tipis and wikiups, while Cheyenne accounts said the village had about 40–65 tipis, and about 50 other structures. The number of warriors involved in the engagement was from 100 to 250, while there were around 384 United States soldiers and civilians present.

== Aftermath ==
Colonel Reynolds was accused of dereliction of duty for failing to properly support the first charge with his entire command; for burning the captured supplies, food, blankets, buffalo robes, and ammunition instead of keeping them for army use; and most of all, for losing hundreds of the captured horses. In January 1877, his court-martial at Cheyenne, Wyoming Territory found Reynolds guilty of all three charges. He was sentenced to suspension from rank and command for one year. His friend and West Point classmate, President Ulysses S. Grant remitted the sentence, but Joseph J. Reynolds never served again. He retired on disability leave on June 25, 1877, exactly one year after the culminating battle of the Great Sioux War at the Little Bighorn. Crook's and Reynolds' failed expedition and their inability to seriously damage the Lakota and Cheyenne at Powder River probably encouraged Indian resistance to the demands of the United States.

== Medals of honor ==
Three Medals of Honor were awarded to soldiers for their actions during the battle:

- Hospital Steward William C. Bryan, temporarily attached to Company K, 2nd United States Cavalry Regiment, "...having his horse killed under him. He continued to fight on foot, and under severe fire and without assistance conveyed two wounded comrades to places of safety, saving them from capture."
- Saddler (Private) Jeremiah J. Murphy, Company F, 3rd United States Cavalry Regiment, "...for trying to save a wounded comrade."
- Blacksmith (Private) Albert Glawinski, Company M, 3rd United States Cavalry Regiment, "During a retreat Blacksmith Glavinski selected exposed positions, he was part of the rear guard."
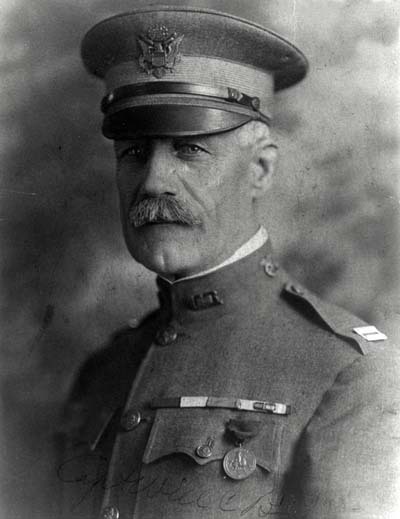
William C. Bryan

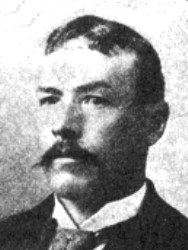
Saddler Jeremiah Murphy

== Casualties ==
Native Americans

Killed in action

- Eagle Chief (Netse Ȯhvéhonevėstse), Northern Cheyenne
- Whirlwind (Hevovetāso), Northern Cheyenne
- Unknown warrior, Oglala Lakota
- several women and children died of exposure following the battle

Wounded in action

- Braided Locks (Hesto'tonȯhevéséhe), Northern Cheyenne, "one cheek furrowed by a bullet"
- Unknown warrior, Northern Cheyenne, "forearm badly shattered"
- Unknown elderly woman, Oglala Lakota, "left in the village"

United States Army

Killed in action

- Private George Schneider, Company K, 2nd Cavalry
- Private Peter Dowdy, Company E, 3rd Cavalry
- Private Michael I. McCannon, Company F, 3rd Cavalry
- Private Lorenzo E. Ayers, Company M, 3rd Cavalry

Wounded in action

- First Lieutenant William C. Rawolle, Company E, 2nd Cavalry
- Sergeant Charles Kaminski, Company M, 3rd Cavalry
- Corporal John Lang, Company E, 2nd Cavalry
- Farrier Patrick Goings, Company K, 2nd Cavalry
- Private John Droege, Company K, 2nd Cavalry
- Private Edward Eagan, Company K, 2nd Cavalry

== Battlefield ==
In the early 20th century, a schoolteacher named Frank Theodore Kelsey filed a desert claim for land along the Powder River, land that encompassed the Reynolds battle site. Kelsey would later become a Montana state senator, and helped to get the soldiers' monument placed near the village site in 1934, but died in 1937. Since then, the battlefield has changed hands over five times. Now, the Powder River / Reynolds Battlefield, located on private land at [45 05 18 N 105 51 28 W], is accessible by Montana Secondary Highway 391 (Moorhead Road), along the Powder River, in Powder River County, Montana. It is about 1 mile (1.6 km) north of the present-day unincorporated community of Moorhead, Montana, and about 34 miles (55 km) southwest of the present-day town of Broadus, Montana.

== Monuments ==
In 1919, a historian named Walter M. Camp learned that while the four soldiers killed in the battle had been left on the field, no headstones had been erected. With help from Major Henry R. Lemly and General Anson Mills (Mills had commanded the 1st Battalion, 3rd Cavalry at the Battle), headstones were prepared by the Quartermaster Corps and shipped by train to Arvada, Wyoming on the Powder River.

In a January 1920 address by Camp to the Order of the Indian Wars in Washington, D.C., he stated that the headstones would "be placed on the battlefield next summer." Despite this, the headstones would remain in storage in Wyoming for another 14 years.

In October 1933, Camp's 1920 address was reprinted in "Winners of the West," and came to the attention of D.C. Wilhelm of Gillette, Wyoming, who informed the writer that the headstones were still in storage. In early 1934, with help from the American Legion, Montana State Senator Frank T. Kelsey, and others, a stone and concrete monument embedded with the soldiers' headstones was placed on the Powder River Battlefield. The monument was dedicated on Memorial Day, May 30, 1934, and it still stands today.

Northern Cheyenne flag, painted on the Cheyenne monument

Across the county road from the soldiers' monument is the Cheyenne monument, a sandstone boulder painted with the flag of the Northern Cheyenne tribe.

== Order of battle ==
Native Americans, Chief's Old Bear, Two Moon, and Little Coyote (Little Wolf). About 60 to 250 warriors.

Native Americans	Tribe	Leaders
Native Americans	Northern Cheyenne	Two Moon; Little Coyote (Little Wolf); Wooden Leg; Old Bear; Maple Tree; White Bull (Ice Bear, Ice); Kate Bighead, sister of Ice; Bear-Walks-on-a-Ridge; Braided Locks (wounded); Powder Face; Yellow Eagle; Bull Coming Behind; Tall Sioux; Eagle Chief †; Whirlwind †
Native Americans	Lakota Sioux	He Dog; Short Bull brother of He Dog; Rock (Inyan) wife of He Dog; Crawler

United States Army, Big Horn Expedition Powder River Detachment, March 16–18, 1876, Colonel Joseph J. Reynolds, 3rd Cavalry, commanding

Big Horn Expedition	Battalion	Companies and others
Colonel Joseph J. Reynolds, commanding	1st Battalion Captain Anson Mills	Company E, 3rd Cavalry: 1Lt John B. Johnson; Company M, 3rd Cavalry: Cpt Anson Mills, 1Lt Augustus C. Paul
Colonel Joseph J. Reynolds, commanding	3rd Battalion Captain Henry E. Noyes	Company I, 2nd Cavalry: Cpt Henry E. Noyes, 1Lt Christopher T. Hall; Company K, 2nd Cavalry: Cpt James R. Egan
Colonel Joseph J. Reynolds, commanding	5th Battalion Captain Alexander Moore	Company E, 2nd Cavalry: 1Lt William C. Rawolle (w), 2Lt Frederick W. Sibley; Company F, 3rd Cavalry: Cpt Alexander Moore, 2Lt Bainbridge Reynolds
Colonel Joseph J. Reynolds, commanding	Medical detachment Assistant Surgeon Curtis E. Munn	Assistant Surgeon Curtis E. Munn; Hospital Steward William C. Bryan
Colonel Joseph J. Reynolds, commanding	Scouts, guides, staff officers, and civilians Major Thaddeus H. Stanton, Chief of Scouts	1Lt George A. Drew, Acting Assistant Quartermaster and Acting Chief of Subsistence, 3rd Cavalry; 2Lt John G. Bourke, Aide-de-camp to General George Crook, 3rd Cavalry; 2Lt Charles E. Morton, Acting Regimental Adjutant, 3rd Cavalry; Robert E. Strahorn, newspaper correspondent for the Rocky Mountain News; Frank Grouard, guide/interpreter; Louis Richard (Reshaw), guide/interpreter; Jack Russell (Buckskin Jack), scout; Baptiste Pourier (Big Bat), scout; Baptiste Garnier (Little Bat), scout; Charlie Jennesse, scout; John Shangreau, scout; Louis Shangreau, scout; 7 additional scouts

United States Army, Col Joseph J. Reynolds (brevet Major General), 3rd United States Cavalry Regiment, in command. About 384 soldiers and scouts.

- 2nd United States Cavalry Regiment
  - Company E, 53 men, First Lieutenant William C. Rawolle (brevet Lieutenant Colonel)
  - Company I, 56 men, Captain Henry E. Noyes
  - Company K, 47 men, Captain James R. Egan
- 3rd United States Cavalry Regiment
  - Staff, 3 men, First Lieutenant George A. Drew, Second Lieutenant Charles E. Morton, Second Lieutenant John G. Bourke
  - Company E, 69 men, First Lieutenant John B. Johnson
  - Company F, 68 men, Captain Alexander Moore (brevet Colonel)
  - Company M, 68 men, Captain Anson Mills.
- Scouts, medical officers, and civilian newspaper reporter, 19 men

== United States officers at the battle ==
- Colonel Joseph Jones Reynolds, Headquarters, 3rd Cavalry
- Major Thaddeus Harlan Stanton, Paymaster, Headquarters, Indian Scouts
- Assistant Surgeon Curtis Emerson Munn, Medical Detachment, Department of the Platte
- Captain Anson Mills, Company M, 3rd Cavalry, Headquarters, 1st Battalion
- Captain Henry Erastus Noyes, Company I, 2nd Cavalry, Headquarters, 3rd Battalion
- Captain Alexander Moore, Company F, 3rd Cavalry, Headquarters, 5th Battalion
- Captain James Ross "Teddy" Egan, Company K, 2nd Cavalry
- First Lieutenant George Augustus Drew, Acting Assistant Quartermaster and Acting Chief of Subsistence, 3rd Cavalry
- First Lieutenant William Charles Rawolle (Wounded), Company E, 2nd Cavalry
- First Lieutenant Christopher Tomkins Hall, Company I, 2nd Cavalry
- First Lieutenant John Burgess Johnson, Company E, 3rd Cavalry
- First Lieutenant Augustus Chouteau Paul, Company M, 3rd Cavalry
- Second Lieutenant Frederick William Sibley, Company E, 2nd Cavalry
- Second Lieutenant Bainbridge Reynolds, Company F, 3rd Cavalry
- Second Lieutenant John Gregory Bourke, Aide-de-camp to General George Crook, Company D, 3rd Cavalry
- Second Lieutenant Charles E. Morton, Acting Regimental Adjutant and Quartermaster of Cavalry, Co. A, 3rd Cavalry

== In popular culture ==
In 1951, Hollywood produced a fictional movie starring Van Heflin, Yvonne De Carlo, Jack Oakie, and Rock Hudson, released in the United States under the name Tomahawk. In the United Kingdom and elsewhere, it was given the name Battle of Powder River, although the plot was actually based on events of Red Cloud's War (also known as the Powder River War) of 1866–8, rather than on the Reynolds battle of 1876.
