= William C. Bryan =

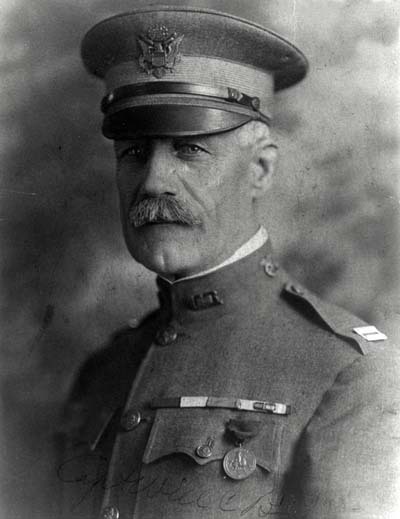
- William C. Bryan
- Born: September 9, 1852; Zanesville, Ohio, U.S.
- Died: March 27, 1933 (aged 80); Santa Monica, California, U.S.
- Spouse: Lucy B. Wetzel (1873–1933)
- Military career
- Allegiance: United States
- Branch: United States Army
- Service years: 1874–1901
- Rank: Captain
- Conflicts: Indian Wars: Battle of Powder River
- Awards: Medal of Honor

William C. Bryan (September 9, 1852 – March 27, 1933) was a United States Army soldier and athlete who received the Medal of Honor. His award came for gallantry during the American Indian Wars. He was also a professional baseball player, sprinter, and coach.

== Biography ==
Bryan was born on September 9, 1852, in Zanesville, Ohio. He enlisted into the United States Army at St. Louis in 1874, and was made a Hospital Steward. Bryan was assigned to the Department of the Platte, commanded by Brigadier General George Crook. In February 1876 he was attached to the Medical Company of the Big Horn Expedition under the direction of Assistant Surgeon Curtis E. Munn.

Bryan accompanied the expedition into Montana Territory during March 1876. On the seventeenth, he was riding with Company K of the 2nd United States Cavalry when the troop was ordered by Colonel Joseph J. Reynolds to charge and capture an encampment of Northern Cheyenne and Lakota Sioux. In the opening actions of the Battle of Powder River, Bryan's horse was killed under him. He continued to fight on foot, carrying two wounded soldiers to safety, inevitably saving them from capture. For these actions, Hospital Steward William C. Bryan was awarded the Medal of Honor in 1899.

Bryan was discharged from the army in 1878. He later re-enlisted in a volunteer regiment from Illinois for service in the Spanish-American War and was eventually promoted to the rank of captain. He retired from the Army in 1901.

Following his first tour of service Bryan began a career as a professional athlete. He was a member of organized baseball and sprinting teams that toured the west including the Bates hose team, a fire department squad in Denver composed of professional sprinters.

In 1890 he was employed by industrialist Francis Ley to coach the Derby Baseball Club in England in a professional baseball league organized by Ley and Albert Spalding.

He returned to America in 1894 to coach the athletics department at the University of Pennsylvania and later Northwestern University.

He married Lucy B. Wetzel (1873-1945) in 1888. Captain William C. Bryan died on March 27, 1933, in Santa Monica, California. He was buried in Fairmount Cemetery in Denver, Colorado.

== Medal of Honor citation ==
Rank and organization: Hospital Steward, Medical Company. Place and date: At Powder River, Montana, March 17, 1876. Entered service at: St. Louis, Missouri, United States. Born: September 9, 1852, Zanesville, Ohio. Date of issue: June 15, 1899.

Citation:

"Hospital Steward Bryan accompanied a detachment of cavalry in a charge on a village of hostile Indians and fought through the engagements, having his horse killed under him. He continued to fight on foot, and under severe fire and without assistance conveyed two wounded comrades to places of safety, saving them from capture."

== See also ==
- Battle of Powder River
