= Alexander Moore (soldier) =

Irish-American U.S. Army officer

- Born: May 13, 1830; Ballymoney, County Antrim, Ireland
- Died: September 30, 1910 (aged 80); Washington, D.C., U.S.
- Burial place: Arlington National Cemetery
- Military career
- Allegiance: United States; Union
- Branch: United States Army; Union Army
- Service years: 1861–1879
- Rank: Captain; Brevet Colonel
- Units: 13th Wisconsin Infantry; 38th U.S. Infantry; 3rd U.S. Cavalry
- Commands: Company F, 3rd U.S. Cavalry; 5th Battalion, Big Horn Expedition
- Conflicts: American Civil War; Peninsula Campaign; Siege of Yorktown; Battle of Williamsburg; Battle of Seven Pines; Northern Virginia Campaign; Second Battle of Bull Run; Battle of Chantilly; Maryland Campaign; Battle of South Mountain; Battle of Antietam; Chancellorsville Campaign; Battle of Chancellorsville; Gettysburg campaign; Battle of Gettysburg; American Indian Wars; Great Sioux War of 1876; Battle of Powder River

Alexander Moore (May 13, 1830 – September 30, 1910) was an Irish American United States Army officer who served during the American Civil War and American Indian Wars.

== Biography ==
Alexander Moore was born in Ballymoney, County Antrim, Northern Ireland to Alexander and Mary Moore on May 13, 1830. He later immigrated to the United States and settled in Illinois.

== Civil War Service ==
At the beginning of the American Civil War, Moore was appointed from Illinois as a First Lieutenant of the 13th Wisconsin Volunteer Infantry in October 1861. He served as an aide-de-camp to Major General Philip Kearny during the Peninsula Campaign and Northern Virginia Campaign until Kearny's death at the Battle of Chantilly, Virginia on September 1, 1862. During the Maryland Campaign, Moore served as an aide-de-camp to Major General Joseph Hooker, including at the Battle of Antietam where Moore carried orders under fire on the battlefield and Hooker was wounded. Moore was promoted to Captain, Aide-de-Camp, United States Volunteers on November 10, 1862, and reappointed on May 3, 1863. Moore served as a staff officer during the Chancellorsville Campaign and saw action at the Battle of Chancellorsville in May 1863. During the Gettysburg campaign, Moore served as part of the staff of Major General Daniel Sickles, commander of the 3rd Corps of the Union Army of the Potomac. He was present in the Peach Orchard at the Battle of Gettysburg on July 2, 1863, when Sickles lost his right leg from a Confederate artillery shell. In 1864, Moore served on a tour of inspection before being appointed to the staff of Brigadier General Alfred Torbert in the Shenandoah Valley. At war's end in 1865, Moore was again assigned as an aide-de-camp to Major General Sickles, in command of the Department of the South. Moore was breveted Major, U.S. Volunteers dated March 6, 1865, and Lieutenant Colonel, U.S. Volunteers on March 13, 1865, for gallant and distinguished conduct in several campaigns of the Army of the Potomac prior to the Battle of Gettysburg, and breveted Colonel, U.S. Volunteers on March 13, 1865, for gallant and highly meritorious conduct at the Battle of Gettysburg, Pennsylvania. Alexander Moore was honorably mustered out of the volunteer service on September 26, 1866.

== Service in the West ==
On January 22, 1867, Moore was appointed Captain, 38th United States Infantry, then became unassigned on November 11, 1869. He final assignment was as a Captain of the 3rd United States Cavalry on December 15, 1870. Moore was stationed with his company on the western frontier, and during early 1876, was ordered to move his Company F of the 3rd Cavalry to Fort Fetterman, Wyoming Territory, to participate with the Big Horn Expedition into Montana Territory. Moore was given command of the expedition's 5th Battalion, consisting of Company E, 2nd U.S. Cavalry and Moore's own Company F, 3rd U.S. Cavalry. Moore commanded this battalion at the Battle of Powder River on March 17, 1876. After the campaign's conclusion, Moore was court-martialed for failing to assist the remainder of the command during the attack on the Indian village. He was found guilty and sentenced to be dismissed from service. However, President Rutherford B. Hayes remitted his sentence. Moore resigned from the Army on August 10, 1879.

== Personal life ==
In 1875, Moore married Mary Law Tyler, daughter of General Daniel Tyler of Connecticut, a West Point graduate and Civil War veteran. Their son Daniel Tyler "Dan" Moore (born 1877) became a Colonel in the U.S. Army, and in 1911 was the founder and first commandant of the U.S. Army School of Fire (now the U.S. Army Field Artillery School) at Fort Sill, Oklahoma.

== Death ==
Alexander Moore died on September 30, 1910, in Washington, D.C., and was buried with full military honors beside his wife in Arlington National Cemetery.
