= Charles M. Robinson III =

American author, illustrator and adventurer

Charles M. Robinson III (May 25, 1949 – September 18, 2012) was an American author, illustrator, and adventurer. He was a history instructor with South Texas College in McAllen, Texas, until early 2012 and was a member of the 2010 Oxford Round Table. He was a graduate of St. Edward's University and the University of Texas–Pan American.

He has written several books that deal with the American Old West, as well as the American Civil War and the Spanish conquest of Mexico. He has also written magazine articles on seafaring, sailing, hunting, guns, and antique automobiles. In 1993 he was awarded the T. R. Fehrenbach Book Award for his work Bad Hand: A Biography of General Ranald S. Mackenzie by the Texas Historical Commission.

== Personal life ==
Robinson was born in Harlingen, Texas, to Rosalyn (née Crispin), a public school teacher, and Charles M. Robinson Jr., a Presbyterian minister. When he was 13, he climbed alone from the Paseo de Cortes to the snow line of Popocatepetl volcano, in Mexico, turning back when he realized he couldn't cross the glaciers without a guide. Two weeks later, he was investigating the 2,800-year-old pyramid of Cuicuilco when a wall gave way, severely injuring his upper lip and jaw. He had scars across his lip for the rest of his lifetime. At 17, he dropped out of high school and obtained a berth as a crewman on a Norwegian cargo ship. In that capacity, he was in Nigeria when the civil war broke out in that country. He worked on several ships serving Africa and northern South America, until a back injury and recurring malaria rendered him unfit for further service. After working two years in Scandinavia, he returned home, and worked as an aircraft mechanic. He had also raced sailing yachts, was a competent horseman, and enjoyed back-country hunting and Austin-Healey sports cars. He had drawn on these experiences to give more depth to several of his books.

In 1971, he joined the staff of the Harlingen Valley Morning Star as a copyboy, eventually rising to city editor in 1979. He later worked as editor of the San Benito News, and the Weslaco, Texas, Mid-Valley Town Crier, while simultaneously continuing his education.

He was married to Perla M. Torres from 1974 until her death in 2004. He has one daughter. Robinson was a chain smoker for more than forty years, and in March 2008, his right lung was removed because of cancer. In June 2011, he suffered from respiratory arrest and spent five days on life support, prompting him to substantially curtail his activities, and ultimately leading to his retirement in February 2012. He died at a hospice in Olmito, Texas on September 18, 2012. A High Church Episcopalian, he was known for his strong religious views.

== Bibliography ==
- Frontier Forts of Texas
- The Frontier World of Fort Griffin: The Life and Death of a Western Town
- Bad Hand: A Biography of General Ranald S. Mackenzie
- The Court Martial of Lieutenant Henry Flipper
- The Buffalo Hunters
- A Good Year to Die: The Story of the Great Sioux War
- Shark of the Confederacy: The Story of the CSS Alabama
- The Indian Trial: The Complete Story of the Warren Wagon Train Massacre and the Fall of the Kiowa Nation
- Satanta: The Life and Death of a War Chief
- Hurricane of Fire: The Union Assault on Fort Fisher
- The Men Who Wear the Star: The Story of the Texas Rangers
- General Crook and the Western Frontier
- The Diary of John Gregory Bourke, Vol. 1, 1872–1876
- The Diary of John Gregory Bourke, Vol. 2, 1876–1878
- The Diary of John Gregory Bourke, Vol. 3, 1878–1880
- The Diary of John Gregory Bourke, Vol. 4, 1880–1881
- The Plains Wars, 1758–1900
- The Spanish Invasion of Mexico, 1519–1521
- Texas and the Mexican War: A History and a Guide.
- The Western Lawman, 1850–1930
- With John Pohl. Aztecs and Conquistadores: The Spanish Invasion and the Collapse of the Aztec Empire
- Roadside History of Louisiana
- The Fall of a Black Army Officer: Racism and the Myth of Henry O. Flipper.
