= Albert Glawinski =

American soldier

- Born: March 1854; Prussia
- Died: before April 1910; United States
- Burial place: Unknown
- Military career
- Allegiance: United States of America
- Branch: United States Army
- Service years: 1873 - 1878
- Rank: Blacksmith Private
- Units: 3rd United States Cavalry Regiment, Company M.
- Conflicts: Indian Wars: Battle of Powder River; Battle of the Rosebud
- Awards: Medal of Honor

Albert Glawinski (or Glavinski; March 1854 – before April 1910) was a United States Army soldier who received the Medal of Honor. His award came for gallantry during the American Indian Wars.

== Life ==
Albert Glawinski was born in 1854 in Prussia and immigrated to the United States in 1868. He joined the United States Army from Pittsburgh, Pennsylvania in December 1873. He was assigned as a Blacksmith Private to Company M, of the 3rd United States Cavalry Regiment. Glawinski was 24 years of age in March 1876, when he fought at the Battle of Powder River, on March 17, 1876. There, he selected exposed positions on the battlefield. Exactly two months later, on June 17, 1876, Albert fought with his company at the Battle of Rosebud. Albert Glawinski was awarded the Medal of Honor for his actions at the Powder River, on October 16, 1877. He was discharged in December 1878.

By March 1907, Glawinski was living in New Orleans, Louisiana. His wife, Helen Schettger Glawinski, was listed as a widow in the 1910 United States census. The exact date of his death and his burial place are unknown.

== Medal of Honor citation ==
The President of the United States of America, in the name of Congress, takes pleasure in presenting the Medal of Honor to Blacksmith Albert Glavinski, United States Army, for extraordinary heroism.

Rank and organization: Blacksmith Private, 3rd United States Cavalry. Place and date: At Powder River, Montana Territory, March 17, 1876. Entered service at: Pittsburgh, Pennsylvania, United States. Born: 1853, Germany. Date of issue: October 16, 1877.

Citation:

"During a retreat Blacksmith Glavinski selected exposed positions, he was part of the rear guard".

== See also ==
- 3rd United States Cavalry Regiment
- Battle of Powder River
- Battle of the Rosebud
