= Thaddeus Harlan Stanton =

United States Army officer (1835–1900)

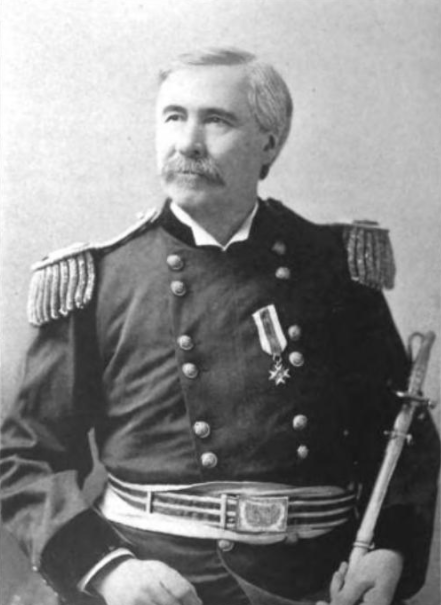
- Born: January 20, 1835; Liberty, Indiana
- Died: January 23, 1900 (aged 65); Omaha, Nebraska
- Burial place: Arlington National Cemetery
- Military career
- Allegiance: United States
- Branch: United States Volunteers; United States Army
- Service years: 1861, 1862–1899
- Rank: Brigadier General
- Commands: Chief of Scouts, Big Horn Expedition; Paymaster-General of the United States Army
- Conflicts: American Civil War; American Indian Wars * Battle of Powder River
- Awards: Brevet Lieutenant Colonel, USV, 1865, for meritorious service during the Civil War; Brevet Lieutenant Colonel, USA, 1876, for gallantry in action against Indians

Member of the Iowa House of Representatives
- In office 1862–1864

Thaddeus H. Stanton (1835–1900), was Paymaster-General of the United States Army 1895–1899. Stanton began his active life as a Republican newspaperman and politician in Iowa. During the Civil War he joined the Union Army, serving as paymaster. After the war, he transferred to the Regular Army, serving in the Paymaster Department. During the Big Horn Expedition 1876, he served in the field, receiving a brevet promotion for bravery.

== Early life ==
Stanton was born in Liberty, Indiana, and moved to Mount Pleasant, Iowa in 1851. In Mount Pleasant he became the editor of an antislavery paper. Later moving to Washington, Iowa, Stanton edited the Republican Washington Press. At the beginning of the Civil War he enlisted and served for three months. Returning to Iowa, Stanton was elected as a Republican to the State House of Representatives for the period 1862–1864.

== Civil War ==
During his three months enlistment, Stanton served as a private in the 3rd District of Columbia Infantry Battalion. When returning to military service, it was as captain in the 19th Iowa Volunteer Infantry Regiment from August 1862. Stanton did not stay long in the infantry, becoming an additional paymaster in the Volunteer Army in October the same year. His service as Paymaster lasted until April 1867, when he transferred to the Regular Army.

== Regular Army ==
In the regular army, Stanton served as major, paymaster from 1867 to 1890, when he was promoted to lieutenant colonel, deputy paymaster general. Further promotions were to colonel, assistant paymaster general, 1893. In 1895, he succeeded William Smith as paymaster general and was promoted to brigadier general,

In spite of serving in the Paymaster Department, Stanton acted as representative of General Sheridan, the Commanding General of the Military Division of the Missouri, in the field during the Big Horn Expedition 1876, serving as chief of scouts, and also, on General Crook's behest, as a reporter for the New-York Tribune. He received a brevet promotion for gallantry at the Battle of Powder River, and later commanded the citizens who joined Crook, but did not thereafter serve at the frontier.

In 1895, Stanton was appointed Paymaster-General of the United States Army, succeeding William Smith. He served until retiring in 1899 and was succeeded by Asa B. Carey.

== Death ==
Thaddeus Harlan Stanton died in Omaha on January 23, 1900, and was buried in Arlington National Cemetery.
