= Jules C. Webber =

American general (1838–1872)

Jules C. Webber (August 27, 1838 – January 12, 1872) was a lieutenant colonel in the Union Army during the American Civil War.

Jules C. Webber was born in Mayville, New York on August 27, 1838. He was a lawyer in Illinois before the Civil War. He was the brother-in law of Union Army Major General Joseph J. Reynolds.

Webber began his Civil War service as a first sergeant in the 18th Illinois Volunteer Infantry Regiment on May 28, 1861. He was appointed as first lieutenant on September 15, 1861. He was appointed captain and aide-de-camp to Major General Frederick Steele on June 7, 1864 and November 7, 1864. Webber was appointed lieutenant colonel of the 18th Illinois Infantry on March 24, 1865. He was mustered out of the volunteers on December 16, 1865.

On February 24, 1866 (resubmitted July 26, 1866), President Andrew Johnson nominated Webber for appointment to the grade of brevet brigadier general of volunteers, to rank from March 13, 1865, and the United States Senate confirmed the appointment on April 10, 1866 (reconfirmed July 27, 1866).

Jules C. Webber died at Vicksburg, Mississippi on January 12, 1872. He was buried in Evergreen Cemetery, Morris, Illinois.

== See also ==
- List of American Civil War brevet generals (Union)
