= Carrie Adell Strahorn =

American explorer and pioneer

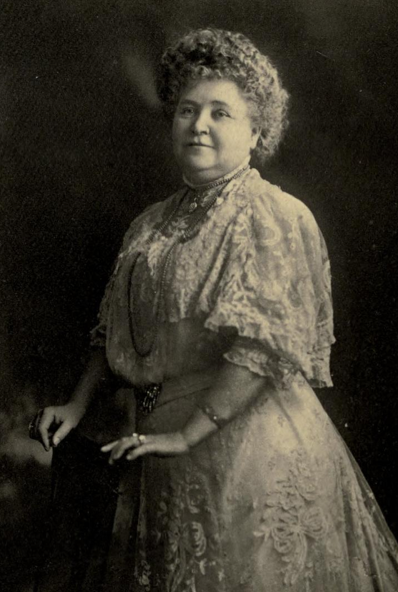

Carrie Adell Strahorn (January 1, 1854 – 1925) was an American explorer and pioneer. She has been called "The mother of the West" and "The queen of the pioneers". She was one of the first white woman to make a complete tour of Yellowstone Park. In 1911, she published Fifteen Thousand Miles by Stage, a memoir of her travels.

== Biography ==
Strahorn was born in Marengo, Illinois on January 1, 1854. Her father was a surgeon in the American Civil War, and was relatively wealthy. His wealth allowed him to send Strahorn to University of Michigan and abroad to study voice. She married Robert E. Strahorn. Robert Strahorn, who refused to work without his wife accompanying him, was an employee of the Union Pacific Railroad, and traveled extensively in the Western United States. The couple moved to Cheyenne, Wyoming, and began traveling. Their first expedition went into the Rocky Mountains. Carrie Strahorn switched trains four times, once for a wreck that occurred. During the Bannock War, Indians attacked the wagon train that they were traveling in, and burned several wagons.

Working with the Idaho-Oregon Land Improvement Company, the couple was involved in founding Caldwell, Idaho. Carrie Strahorn was one of the founding members of the Presbyterian Church of Caldwell. They were also involved in founding Hailey, Idaho, Weiser, Idaho, Payette, Idaho, and Shoshone, Idaho. Robert subsequently left the company, and they moved to Bellingham, Washington, before moving to Boston; and eventually back to Washington, settling in Spokane, and later moving to San Francisco. Carrie Strahorn died in 1925, at the age of 72.
