= Jeremiah Murphy (piper) =

- Born: Loughrea, County Galway
- Instrument: Pipes
- Years active: 1811–1815

Jeremiah Murphy (fl. 1811–1815) was an Irish piper.

A native of Loughrea, County Galway, Murphy announced his relocation to Dublin in an edition of The Freeman's Journal, dated September 1811:

"THE IRISH PIPES. Jeremiah Murphy, late of Loughrea, begs leave to acquaint the lovers of national music that he at present plays at Darcy's Tavern, Cook Street, where he humbly hopes his exertions to please will obtain for him that encouragement with which he has for so many years been honored by the gentlemen of Munster and Connacht."

Early in 1813, Murphy transferred to the Griffin Tavern, on Dame Street, described as "a sort of “Free-and-Easy” establishment." He ceased performing in taverns in 1815, and what became of him afterwards is unknown.
