= Strayhorn =

Strayhorn may refer to:

- Billy Strayhorn (1915–1967), American composer
- Carole Keeton Strayhorn (1939–2025), American politician
- Strayhorn, Mississippi, an unincorporated community
- The Strayhorns, Alan Jackson's backing band

== See also ==
- Fred Strahorn
