= Battle of Prairie Dog Creek =

Battle in the Great Sioux War of 1876

Coordinates: 45.2694°N 106.6242°W

- Part of the Great Sioux War of 1876
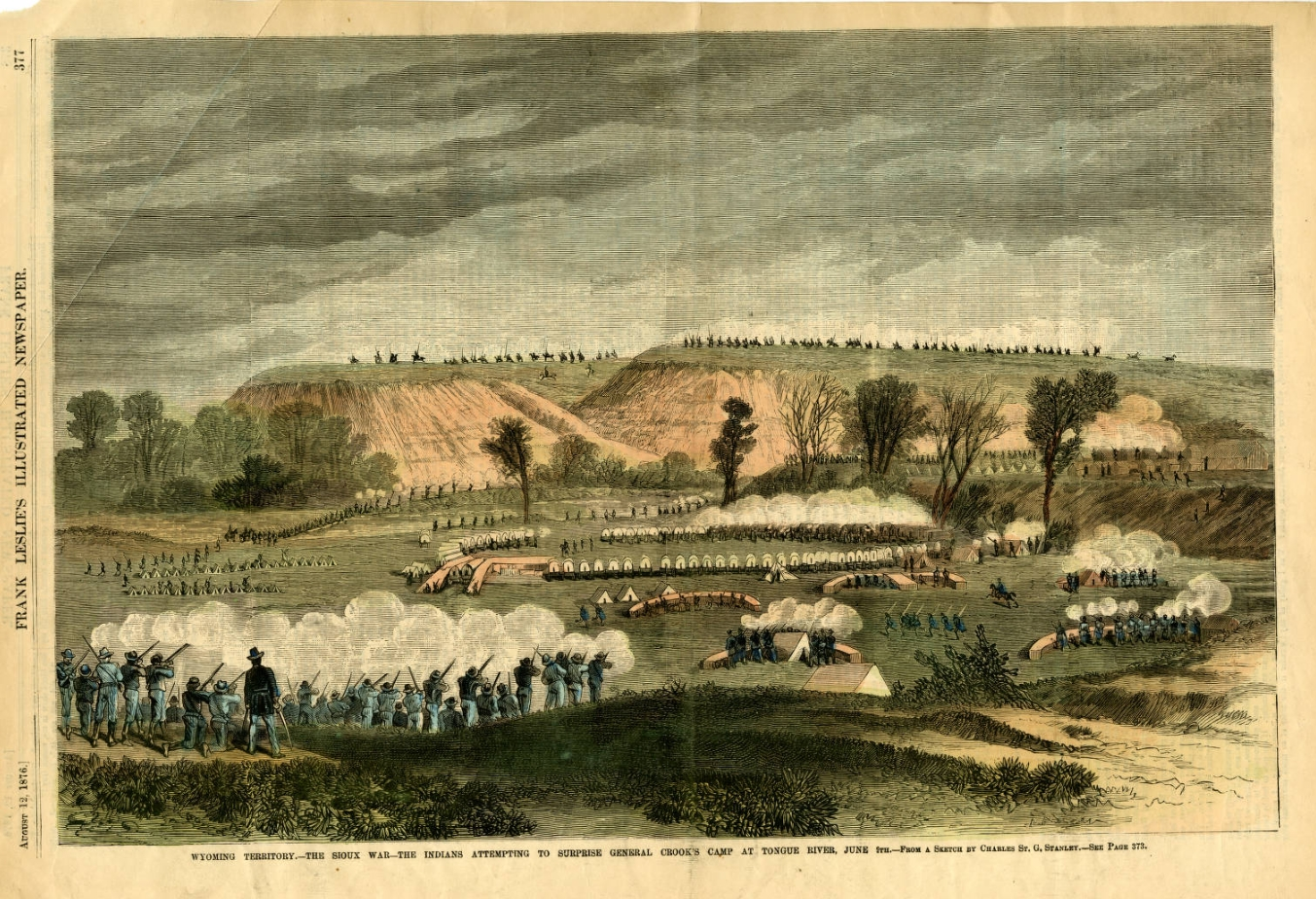
- Sketch of the attack on Brig. Gen. George Crook’s command at Tongue River on June 9, 1876 published in Frank Leslie's Illustrated Newspaper
Date	June 9, 1876
Location	Sheridan County, Wyoming and Rosebud County, Montana
Result	American victory

Belligerents
United States	Northern Cheyenne

Commanders and leaders
(United States) George R. Crook (United States) Anson Mills (United States) John G. Bourke	Unknown

Strength
950+ soldiers 100+ civilians	~200

Casualties and losses
2 soldiers wounded 1 mule killed 2 horses wounded	2 killed or wounded

The Battle of Prairie Dog Creek, also known as the Skirmish at Tongue River Heights, or the Battle of the Tongue River (1876), part of the Great Sioux War of 1876, occurred on June 9, 1876, at the confluence of Prairie Dog Creek and the Tongue River primarily in Wyoming Territory.

== The battle ==
On June 9, 1876, soldiers and civilians under the command of Brigadier General George R. Crook, were encamped on the Tongue River at the mouth of Prairie Dog Creek. With Crook, were over 950 United States cavalry and infantry soldiers, and about 100 civilians. While the soldiers were in camp on June 9, some observed two mounted Cheyenne warriors riding along the bluffs on the north bank of the Tongue River. Then, about 200 concealed Cheyenne warriors suddenly fired a volley of .44 Henry, and .50 caliber rifles from the bluffs into Crook's camp. Another small band of warriors had remained hidden to the east of Crook's camp, with the intention of stealing the soldiers' horses when their attention was diverted. Crook ordered an attack. Companies C, G, and H, of the 9th U.S. Infantry crossed the river, and after wading through the rivers' frigid water, scaled the nearly vertical bluffs. Companies A, E, I, and M of the Third U.S. Cavalry, the battalion under the command of Captain Anson Mills also responded, and crossed the river just to the west, and on the left flank of the infantrymen. Accompanying the cavalry was the newspaper reporter John F. Finerty, the "Fighting Irish Pencil Pusher" for the Chicago Times. After reaching a grove of cottonwood trees, the cavalry dismounted. Leaving every fourth man as a horse holder, the cavalrymen advanced dismounted up the bluffs. After reaching the top, the soldiers drove back the Cheyenne warriors who had fired into the camp earlier, north about half a mile, away from the crest of the ridge. But at a second ridge line, the Cheyenne's reformed. Soldiers then drove them from it, crossing into Montana Territory. Warriors reformed a third time, but this final effort lasted only briefly, and the Cheyenne warriors retreated north. The warriors intending to steal the soldiers' horses did not attempt to do so, the horses being closely guarded. Thus ended the Battle of Prairie Dog Creek.

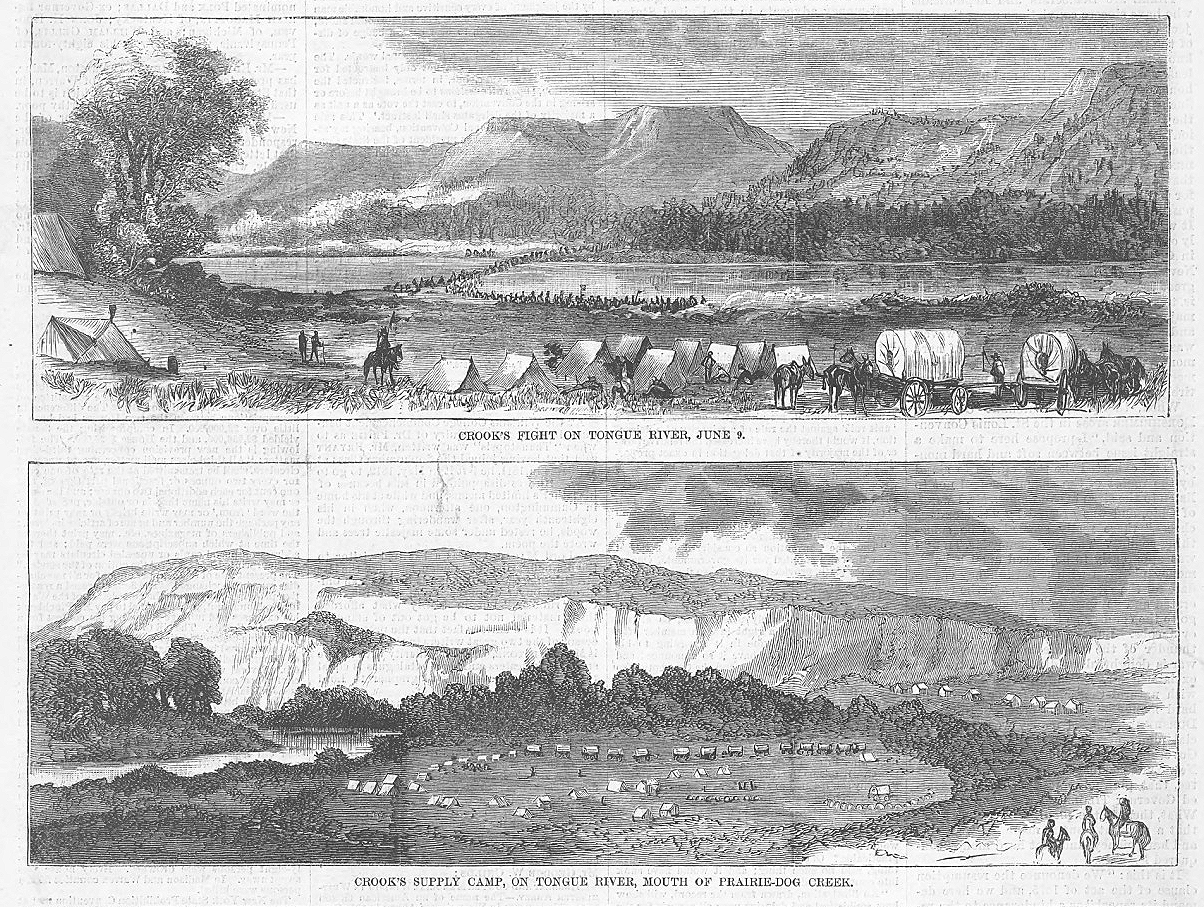
Crook's Fight on Tongue River, June 9, 1876, as pictured by Harper's Weekly.

== Aftermath ==
In the fight, the casualties included two Cheyennes killed or wounded, two soldiers who suffered minor wounds, one of the soldiers' mules killed, and two of the soldiers' horses wounded. The soldiers seemed to have rather enjoyed the skirmish, since it relieved the boredom in their otherwise mundane life in bivouac. Since the soldiers' mounts were well secured, the Cheyennes suffered only a lost opportunity to steal some horses. Most of the same combatants that fought at Prairie Dog Creek on both sides would soon move north and see action at the Battle of the Rosebud, only eight days later. In addition, many of the Cheyenne warriors would also fight in the Battle of the Little Bighorn, just 16 days after the Battle of Prairie Dog Creek.

== The battlefield ==
The battlefield is located on private land, at the confluence of Prairie Dog Creek and the Tongue River in northern Sheridan County, Wyoming, and southern Rosebud County, Montana near present-day Decker, Montana.

== Order of battle ==
United States Army, Department of the Platte - Brigadier General George R. Crook, Commanding. Only company officers are listed.

- 2nd United States Cavalry Regiment,
  - Company A, Captain Thomas Bull Dewees, Second Lieutenant Daniel Crosby Pearson (First Lieutenant Martin O'Brien joined command 12 July)
  - Company B, First Lieutenant William Charles Rawolle
  - Company D, First Lieutenant Samuel Miller Swigert, Second Lieutenant Henry Dustin Huntington
  - Company E, Captain Elijah Revillo Wells, Second Lieutenant Frederick W. Sibley
  - Company I, Captain Henry Erastus Noyes, Second Lieutenant Frederick William Kingsbury
- 3rd United States Cavalry Regiment,
  - Company A, First Lieutenant Joseph Lawson
  - Company B, Captain Charles Meinhold
  - Company C, Captain Frederick Van Vliet
  - Company D, Second Lieutenant James Ferdinand Simpson
  - Company E, Captain Alexander Sutorius, First Lieutenant Adolphus H. Von Luettwittz
  - Company F, Second Lieutenant Bainbridge Reynolds
  - Company G, First Lieutenant Emmett Crawford
  - Company I, Captain William Howard Andrews, Second Lieutenant James E. H. Foster
  - Company L, Captain Peter Dumont Vroom, Second Lieutenant George Chase
  - Company M, Captain Anson Mills, First Lieutenant Augustus Choutea Paul, Second Lieutenant Frederick Schwatka
- 4th United States Infantry Regiment,
  - Company D, Captain Avery Billings Cain
  - Company F, Captain Gerhard Luhn
- 9th United States Infantry Regiment,
  - Company C, Captain Samuel Munson
  - Company G, Captain Thomas Bredin Burrowes, First Lieutenant William Lewis Carpenter
  - Company H, Captain Andrew Sheridan Burt, Second Lieutenant Edgar Brooks Robertson
- Civilians and Scouts, Assistant Surgeon Julius Herman Patzki

Native Americans, about 200 warriors.

- Northern Cheyenne.
