= Joseph J. Reynolds =

American engineer, educator and military officer

Joseph Jones Reynolds
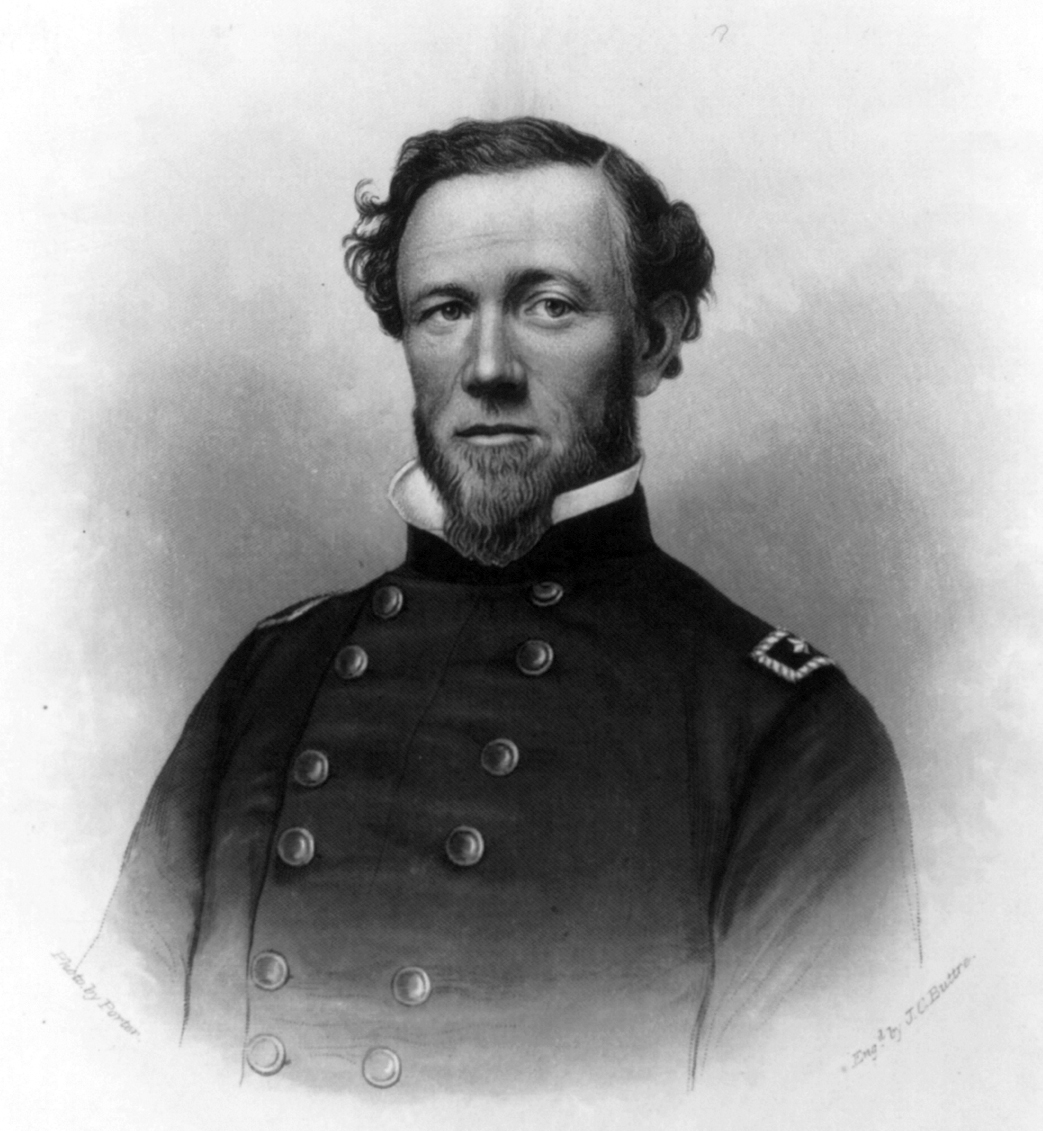
- J. J. Reynolds
- Born: January 4, 1822; Flemingsburg, Kentucky, U.S.
- Died: February 25, 1899 (aged 77); Washington, D.C., U.S.
- Burial place: Arlington National Cemetery (Arlington County, Virginia)
- Military career
- Allegiance: United States; Union
- Branch: United States Army; Union Army
- Service years: 1843–1857, 1861–1877
- Rank: Colonel, USA; Major General, USV
- Commands: XIX Corps; VII Corps; Army of Arkansas; 26th Infantry Regiment; 3rd Cavalry Regiment
- Conflicts: American Civil War: Battle of Cheat Mountain; Battle of Hoover's Gap; Battle of Chickamauga; Indian Wars: Battle of Powder River

Joseph Jones Reynolds (January 4, 1822 – February 25, 1899) was an American engineer, educator, and military officer who fought in the American Civil War and the postbellum Indian Wars.

== Early life and career ==
Reynolds was born in Flemingsburg, Kentucky. He briefly attended Wabash College before he received an appointment in 1839 to the United States Military Academy at West Point, New York. After graduating tenth of thirty-nine cadets in the Class of 1843, Reynolds was brevetted as a second lieutenant and initially assigned to the 4th U.S. Artillery.

He successively served at Fort Monroe in Virginia, Carlisle Barracks in central Pennsylvania, and then in Zachary Taylor's occupation army in Texas in 1845 before returning to the academy as assistant professor in 1846. On December 3 of that same year, he married Mary Elizabeth Bainbridge.

He left West Point in 1857 and subsequently returned to frontier duty, this time in the Indian Territory. He resigned his army commission and taught engineering at Washington University in St. Louis for a time.

In 1860, he moved to the state of Indiana, where he owned a grocery business with one of his brothers.

== American Civil War ==
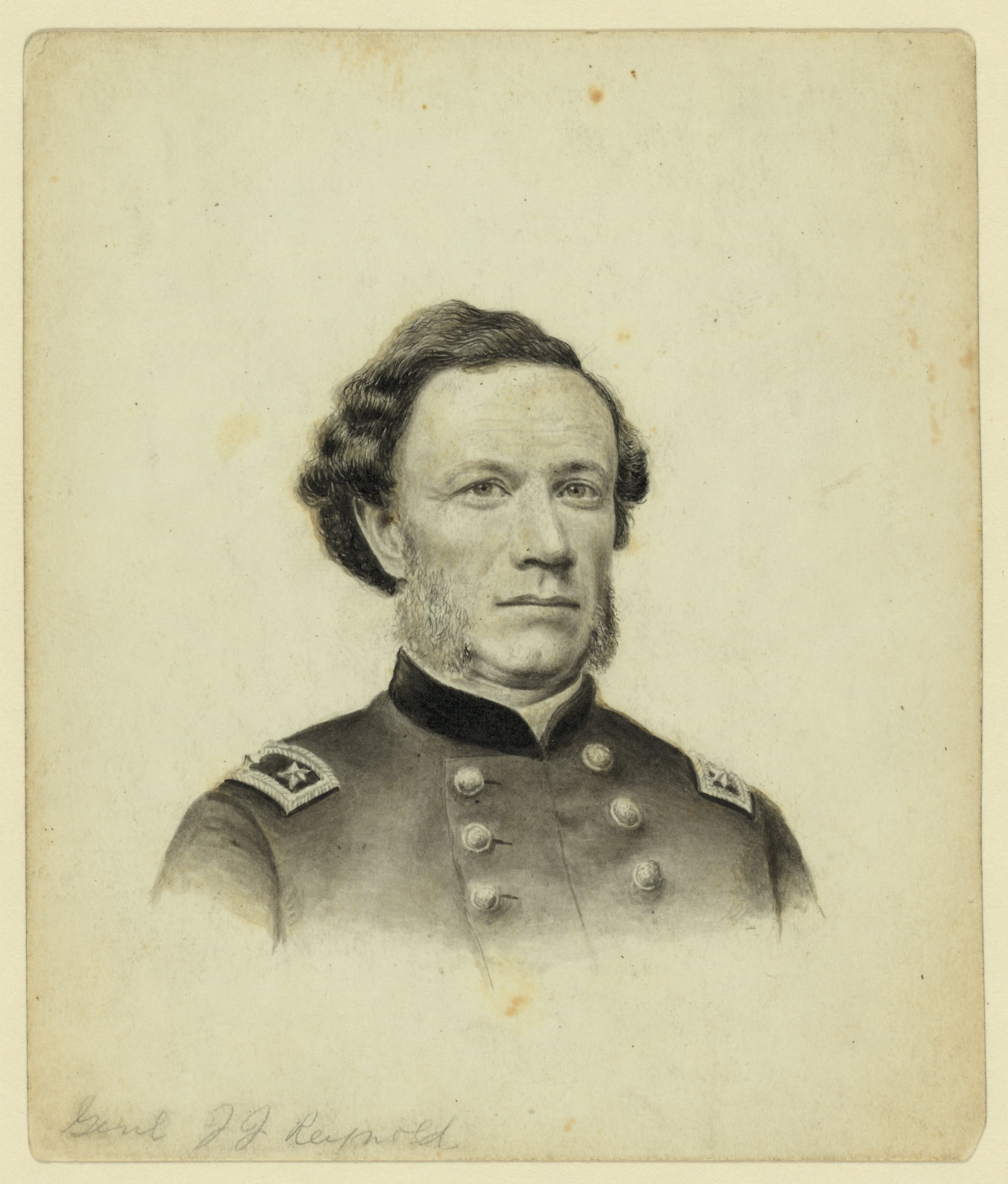
Joseph J. Reynolds in 1862

After receiving a colonel's commission from Governor Oliver P. Morton, Reynolds was placed in command of Indiana's Camp Morton, the wartime state's militia muster encampment at Indianapolis. Reynolds's 10th Indiana Volunteer regiment was sent to western Virginia, where it played a decisive role repulsing Confederates under Robert E. Lee at Cheat Mountain.

Although promoted to brigadier general, Reynolds resigned in January 1862 and resumed training Indiana regiments at Camp Morton until November 1862 without a commission. Retroactively appointed colonel of the 75th Indiana volunteers, brigadier general with orders to build a depot and field works in Carthage, Tennessee, and then major general of U.S. volunteers, Reynolds commanded a division of XIV Corps, Army of the Cumberland, at Hoover's Gap and Chickamauga.

After serving as the army's chief of staff before Chattanooga, Reynolds was transferred to the Gulf of Mexico, where he led a division of XIX Corps that garrisoned New Orleans, Louisiana. He was later promoted to the command of the XIX Corps, and then commanded VII Corps in Arkansas.

He was the brother-in law of Brevet Brigadier General Jules C. Webber.

== Postbellum career ==
After the war, Reynolds remained in the regular army as the Colonel of the 26th U.S. Infantry Regiment and was then assigned command of the Department of Arkansas. He later was transferred to duty in Texas during Reconstruction, replacing Charles Griffin in charge of the Department of Texas. On October 31, 1869 he removed Colbert Caldwell, whose moderate Republican beliefs Radical Republicans had alleged were an impediment to Reconstruction, from his position as an associate justice of the Texas Supreme Court. When military rule in Texas ceased in 1870, Reynolds again returned to frontier garrison duty, and was made the Colonel of the 3rd United States Cavalry Regiment.

== Battle of Powder River ==
Reynolds participated the Black Hills War, of 1876-1877, and led the Big Horn Expedition out of Fort Fetterman, Wyoming Territory, on March 1, 1876 in search of "hostile" Lakota Sioux and Northern Cheyenne Indians under Sitting Bull and Crazy Horse. On the morning of March 17, 1876, Reynolds and six companies, about 380 men of the 2nd and 3rd United States Cavalry Regiments attacked a Northern Cheyenne and Oglala Lakota Sioux village on the Powder River, in what became known as the Battle of Powder River. The Native Americans were camped on the west bank of the River in southeastern Montana Territory. After a five-hour engagement during which Reynolds' men suffered four killed, six wounded, dozens frostbitten, and inflicted only a few killed and wounded, he withdrew his forces from the battlefield and retreated about 20 miles (32 km) to the south. Native leaders in the village included Two Moon, He Dog, Little Wolf, and Old Bear. During the battle, He Dog rode a horse which belonged to Crazy Horse, who was camped only about 25 miles (40 km) to the north during the St. Patrick's Day battle.

Reynolds' winter campaign of March 1876 ended in failure and he was subsequently court-martialed for three charges. He was found guilty of all of the charges and given the sentence of suspension of rank and pay for one year's period. Although the sentence of the court-martial was suspended by President Ulysses S. Grant, who was Reynolds' 1843 West Point classmate, Joseph J. Reynolds resigned from the U.S. Army on June 25, 1877.

== Death ==
Joseph Jones Reynolds died on February 25, 1899, in Washington, D.C., at the age of 77, and is buried in Arlington National Cemetery.

== See also ==
- List of American Civil War generals (Union)
