= Jeremiah J. Murphy =

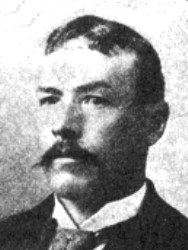
- Jeremiah J. Murphy
- Born: February 2, 1858; County Cork, Ireland
- Died: May 12, 1932 (aged 74); Detroit, Michigan, U.S.
- Burial place: Mount Olivet Cemetery; Washington, D.C., U.S.
- Military career
- Allegiance: United States
- Branch: United States Army
- Rank: Private
- Units: Company F, 3rd Cavalry Regiment
- Conflicts: Indian Wars; Battle of Powder River; Battle of the Rosebud
- Awards: Medal of Honor

Jeremiah J. Murphy (February 2, 1858 – May 12, 1932), was a United States Army soldier who received the Medal of Honor. His award came for gallantry during the American Indian Wars.

== Early life ==
Jeremiah J. Murphy was born on February 2, 1858, in County Cork, Ireland. Before he was 18, he immigrated to the United States.

== Career ==
Murphy enlisted into the U.S. Army in Boston, Massachusetts on February 13, 1875, just eleven days after his eighteenth birthday, which was the minimal age for enlistment. Murphy was assigned to Company F, of the 3rd United States Cavalry Regiment. He was 19 years of age in March 1876, when he fought at the Battle of Powder River, Montana Territory on March 17, 1876. There, he attempted to rescue a badly wounded fellow 3rd Cavalry soldier, Private Lorenzo E. Ayers of Company M. Three months after the Powder River battle, on June 17, 1876, he fought in the Battle of the Rosebud, Montana Territory. On October 16, 1877, Murphy was awarded the Medal of Honor at Camp Sheridan, Nebraska, for his actions at Powder River.

== Death ==
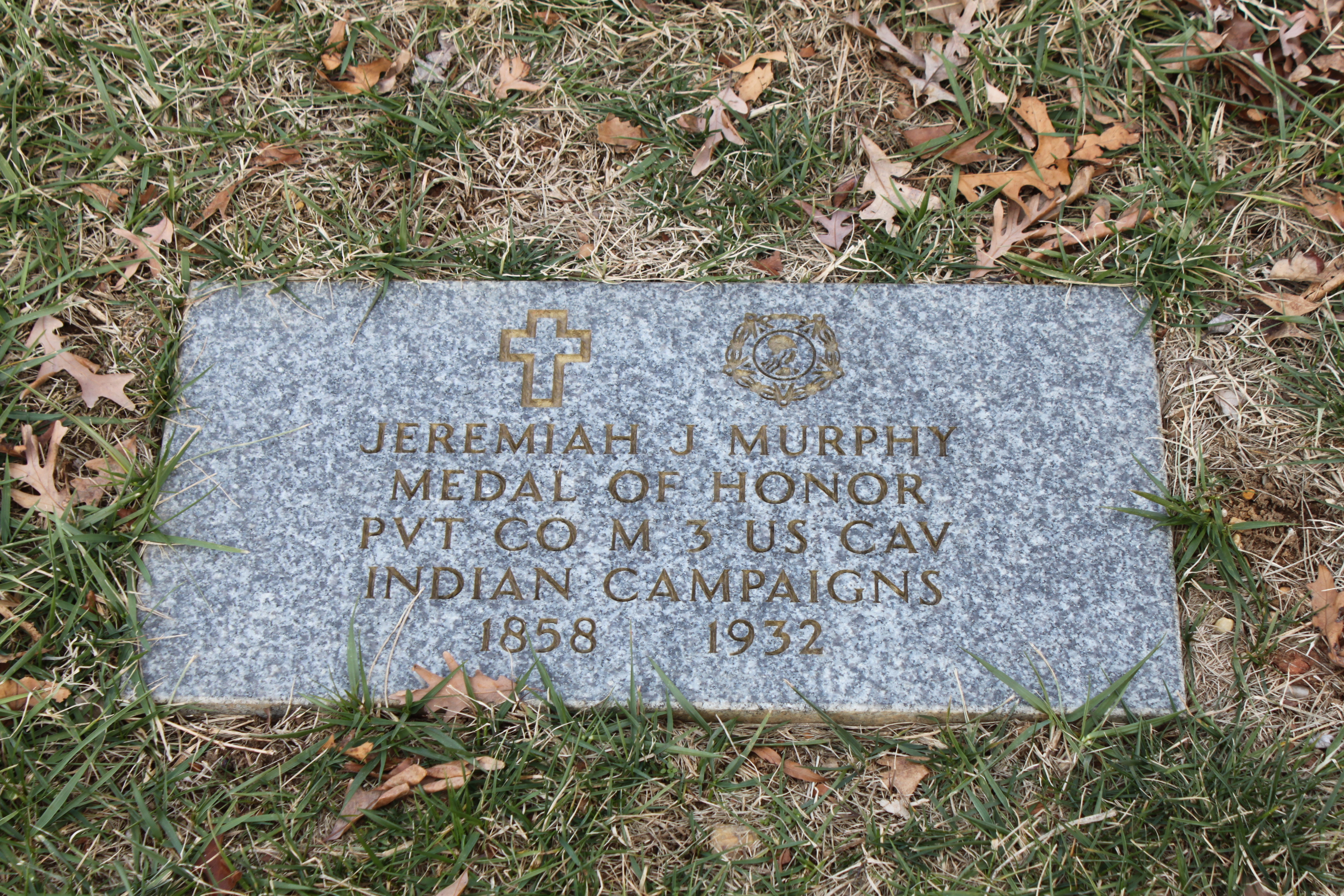
Grave of Murphy at Mount Olivet Cemetery

Jeremiah J. Murphy died on May 12, 1932, in Detroit, Michigan, where his daughter Elizabeth resided. He is interred at Mount Olivet Cemetery in Washington, D.C.

== Medal of Honor citation ==
Rank and organization: Saddler Private, 3rd United States Cavalry. Place and date: At Powder River, Montana, March 17, 1876. Entered service at: Boston, Massachusetts, United States. Born: February 2, 1852, County Cork, Ireland. Date of issue: October 16, 1877.

Citation:

"Being the only member of his picket not disabled, he attempted to save a wounded comrade".

== See also ==
- List of Medal of Honor recipients for the Indian Wars
- Battle of Powder River
- Battle of the Rosebud
