= John Gregory Bourke =

Civil War Union Army officer and writer (1846–1896)

- John Gregory Bourke
- Born: June 23, 1846; Philadelphia, Pennsylvania, US
- Died: June 8, 1896 (aged 49); Philadelphia, Pennsylvania, US
- Burial place: Arlington National Cemetery
- Military career
- Allegiance: United States of America; Union
- Branch: United States Army; Union Army
- Service years: 1862–1896
- Rank: Captain
- Units: 15th Pennsylvania Cavalry; 3rd U.S. Cavalry
- Commands: Chief of Scouts during the Apache Wars
- Conflicts: American Civil War: Stones River; Chickamauga; Great Sioux War of 1876: Battle of Powder River; Battle of Prairie Dog Creek; Battle of Rosebud; Battle of Slim Buttes; Apache Wars Garza Revolution
- Awards: Medal of Honor
- Other work: writer

John Gregory Bourke (/bɜːrk/; June 23, 1846 – June 8, 1896) John G. Bourke was born in Philadelphia, Pennsylvania to Irish immigrant parents, Edward Joseph and Anna (Morton) Bourke, who emigrated from western Ireland. His early education was extensive and included Latin, Greek and Gaelic. He attended parochial schools and St. Josephs College, a Jesuit school.

He was a Captain in the United States Army, a prolific diarist, acclaimed author and internationally respected ethnologist. Bourke wrote several books about the American Old West, including ethnologies of its indigenous peoples. As a teenager, he was awarded a Medal of Honor for serving as a cavalryman in the Union army during the American Civil War. Based on his service during the war, his commander nominated him to West Point, where he graduated in 1869, allowing him to become an Army officer until his death in 1896. He is interred at Arlington National Cemetery.

== Military career ==
John G. Bourke enlisted in the Fifteenth Pennsylvania Volunteer Cavalry in 1862, claiming to be nineteen years old when he was only sixteen at the time. He fought at the Battle of Stones River (December 31 - January 2) near Murfreesboro, TN. This was a bloody battle for both sides and John Bourke received a Medal of Honor for his "gallantry in action." Months later (September 18–20, 1863) he fought in the Battle of Chickamauga in northwest Georgia, another very bloody engagement.

After the end of the Civil War, John Bourke was nominated by Major General H. Thomas, his commander in the Army of the Cumberland, to be a cadet at the United States Military Academy. He entered West Point on October 17, 1865 and graduated on June 15, 1869, achieving the rank of Second Lieutenant. Among his classmates who served as general officers were Samuel Escue Tillman, William P. Duvall, Earl Dennison Thomas, Charles Morton, and William W. Robinson Jr. Among his prominent classmates who did not attain general's rank were Eric Bergland, Arthur Sherburne Hardy, and James Ezekiel Porter.

On September 1, 1871, John Bourke was assigned as an Aide-de-Camp for Brevet Major General George Crook. He joined General Crook at Fort Whipple (Prescott, AZ) and then traveled extensively across the Arizona Territory in search of Native American groups that were considered troublesome to the miners, ranchers and settlers of the territory. In pursuit of his duties he visited several of the U.S. Army stations including Fort Whipple, Camp Lincoln (Fort Verde), Apache Camp, San Carlos Camp, Fort Grant and Camp McDowell. His routes included crossing the rugged wilderness of the Superstition and Mazatzal Mountains.

After several Yavapai and Apache groups had been captured and resettled, in 1875 John Bourke followed General Crook to the Department of The Platte at Fort Omaha, Nebraska. He was engaged in the battles at Rosebud Creek and Slim Buttes, enduring both fierce fighting and horrendous winter conditions in the Wyoming and Dakota territories.

General Crook was reassigned to the Arizona Territory in 1883 and John Bourke again followed him there. He participated in the second (1883) and third (1886) captures of Geronimo in Mexico.

== Ethnologist and Author ==
As Crook's aide-de-camp, he had the opportunity to witness every facet of life in the Old West—the military battles, the settlers, the Native Americans, the geography and flora and fauna, internal military and government politics and Indian Agency issues. Bourke kept a diary in sequential journals throughout his adult life, documenting his observations in the West. He used these notes as the basis for his later monographs and writings.

In November, 1872 Bourke began keeping daily journals which he kept through the remainder of his life. These writings are considered invaluable original sources and research documents by Western historians. The 124 manuscript volumes are held at the United States Military Academy Library at West Point.

Granted time off from military duties at the convenience of the Army, Bourke lived among and studied Native American cultures of the Apache, Navajo, Zuni, and Plains tribes. His detailed documentation of customs, religious rites, spiritual ceremonies, languages and vocabularies brought him to the attention of the leading American anthropologists and ethnologists of the day. Both Professor E. S. Holden of the U. S. Naval Observatory and James O. Dorsey brought Bourke’s research to the attention of John Wesley Powell, then director of the Bureau of Ethnology at the Smithsonian Institution Powell mentored Bourke and encouraged his further development as an ethnologist.

Through the 1870s and 1880s Bourke maintained a public presence as both a writer of popular articles and books about life in the frontier West, and as a writer of scholarly books and monographs about Native American cultural rites. As his reputation grew, he was elected to membership in the Association for the Advancement of Science and to the Anthropological Society of Washington in 1886-1887.

Bourke’s reputation and achievements as an ethnologist led to his eventual appointment as curator of an exhibit of 890 historical artifacts at the World’s Columbian Exposition held in Chicago in 1893.

In 1885 Bourke began a campaign for equitable treatment of Native Americans, publicly denouncing the US Government’s Indian programs. He advocated keeping the Chiricahua Apache in Arizona rather than removing them to exile in Florida. He was an ardent opponent of sending Native American children to off-reservation Indian schools. Per Bourke, ‘”Much of our trouble with these tribes could have been averted, had we shown what would appear to them as a spirit of justice and fair dealing.” These were at the time unpopular positions.In The Diaries of John Gregory Bourke, Edward Robinson wrote “He (Bourke) began to attribute much of the (Indian) problem to avarice, ignorance and intolerance on the part of the whites.”

As his criticisms of the federal government’s Indian policies became more broadly known, Bourke’s promotion stagnated at the rank of captain for the remainder of his career.

Bourke was a prolific author. In addition to his highly acclaimed On The Border With Crook, he wrote An Apache Campaign In The Sierra Madre, Apache Medicine Men, and The Snake Dance Of The Moquis (Hopis) Of Arizona.

The Readers Encyclopedia of the American West summarizes Bourke’s contributions thusly: “One of the last in the tradition of humanist-scientific officers who recorded the American West, Bourke’s historical work is vivid, observant, humorous, and his ethnological studies remain invaluable to modern scholars.”

== Marriage and family ==
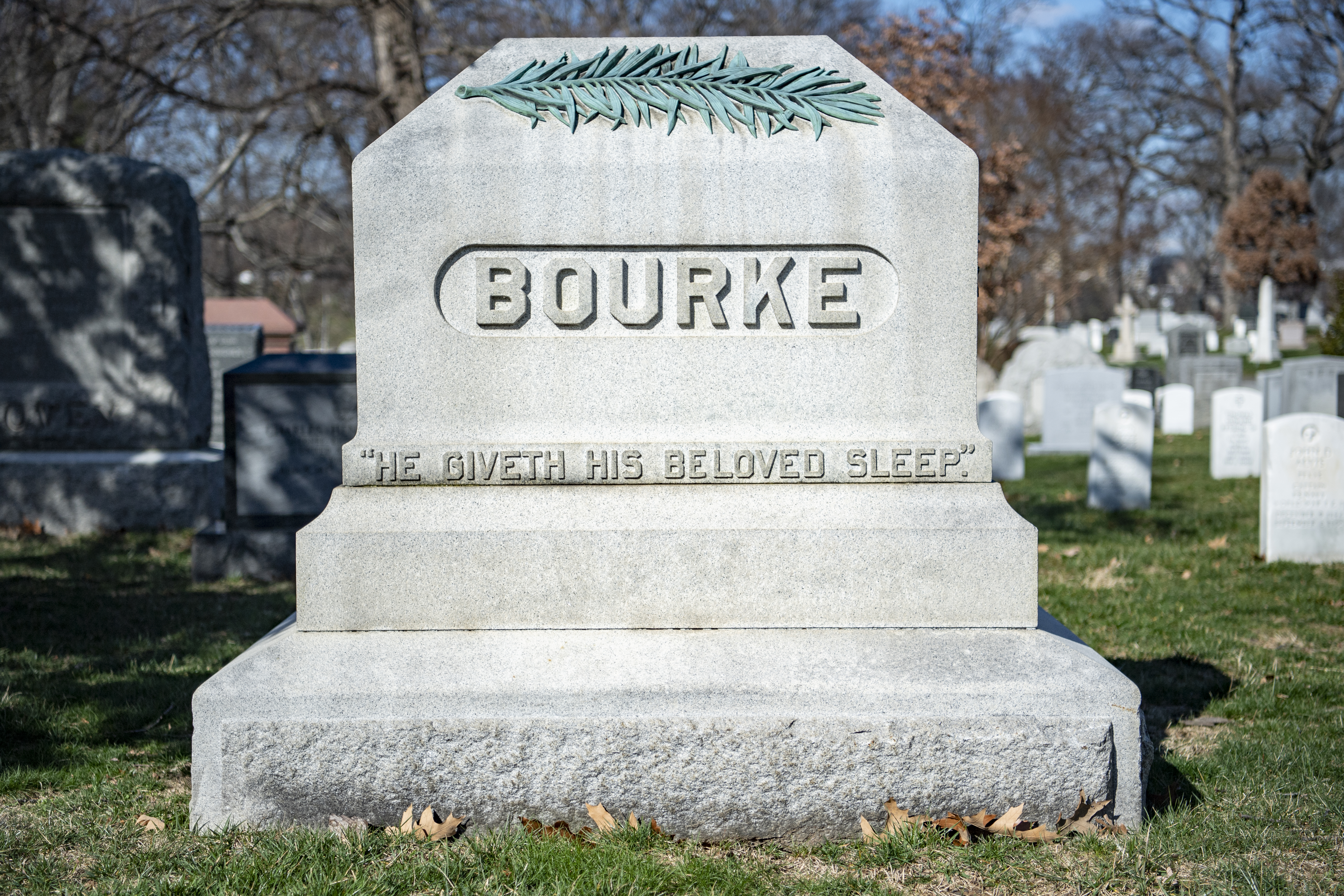
Grave at Arlington National Cemetery

Bourke married Mary F. Horbach of Omaha, Nebraska, on July 25, 1883. They had three daughters together. Bourke died in the Polyclinic Hospital in Philadelphia on June 8, 1896, and is buried at Arlington National Cemetery. His wife was buried with him after her death in 1927

== Writings ==
- The Snake-Dance of the Moquis of Arizona: Being A Narrative of a Journal from Santa Fe, New Mexico, to the Villages of the Moqui Indians of Arizona. U.S. Bureau of Ethnology. New York: Charles Scribner's Sons. 1884.
- An Apache Campaign in the Sierra Madre: An Account of the Expedition in Pursuit of the Hostile Chiricahua Apaches in the Spring of 1883. New York: Charles Scribner's Sons. 1886. Full-text version also available via Internet Archive.
- Compilation of Notes and Memoranda Bearing Upon the Use of Human Ordure and Human Urine in the Rites of a Religious or Semi-Religious Character Among Various Nations. U.S. War Department. 1888.
- Mackenzie's Last Fight with the Cheyennes: A Winter Campaign in Wyoming and Montana. 1890. (See also Ranald Slidell Mackenzie.)
- Scatalogic Rites of All Nations. Washington, D.C.: Lowdermilk. 1891.
- On the Border with Crook. New York: Charles Scribner's Sons. 1892. Full-text version also available via Internet Archive.
- Medicine-Men of the Apache. U.S. Bureau of Ethnology. Washington: Government Printing Office. 1892. ISBN 9780598284655. Full-text version also available via Internet Archive.
- The Laws of Spain in their Application to the American Indians. Washington, D.C.: Judd & Detweiler, Printers. 1894.
- Bourke, John Gregory (1895). Folk-Foods of the Rio Grande Valley and of Northern Mexico., reprinted from the Journal of American Folk-lore, April–May 1895
- Bourke, John Gregory (1896). Notes on the Language and Folk-Usage of the Rio Grande Valley (With Especial Regard to Survivals of Arabic Custom)., reprinted from Journal of American Folk-lore, April–June 1896
- Bourke, John Gregory (1920). The Urine Dance of the Zuni Indians of New Mexico. Full-text version also available via Internet Archive.
- Charles M. Robinson III (ed.). The Diaries of John Gregory Bourke: Vol. I – November 20, 1872, to July 28, 1876, Vol. II – July 29, 1876 to April 7, 1878, Vol. III – June 1, 1878 to June 22, 1880.
- Scatalogic Rites of All Nations.

== See also ==
- List of Medal of Honor recipients
- List of American Civil War Medal of Honor recipients: A–F
- Worlds Columbian Exposition
