= Surgeon's assistant =

Healthcare professional

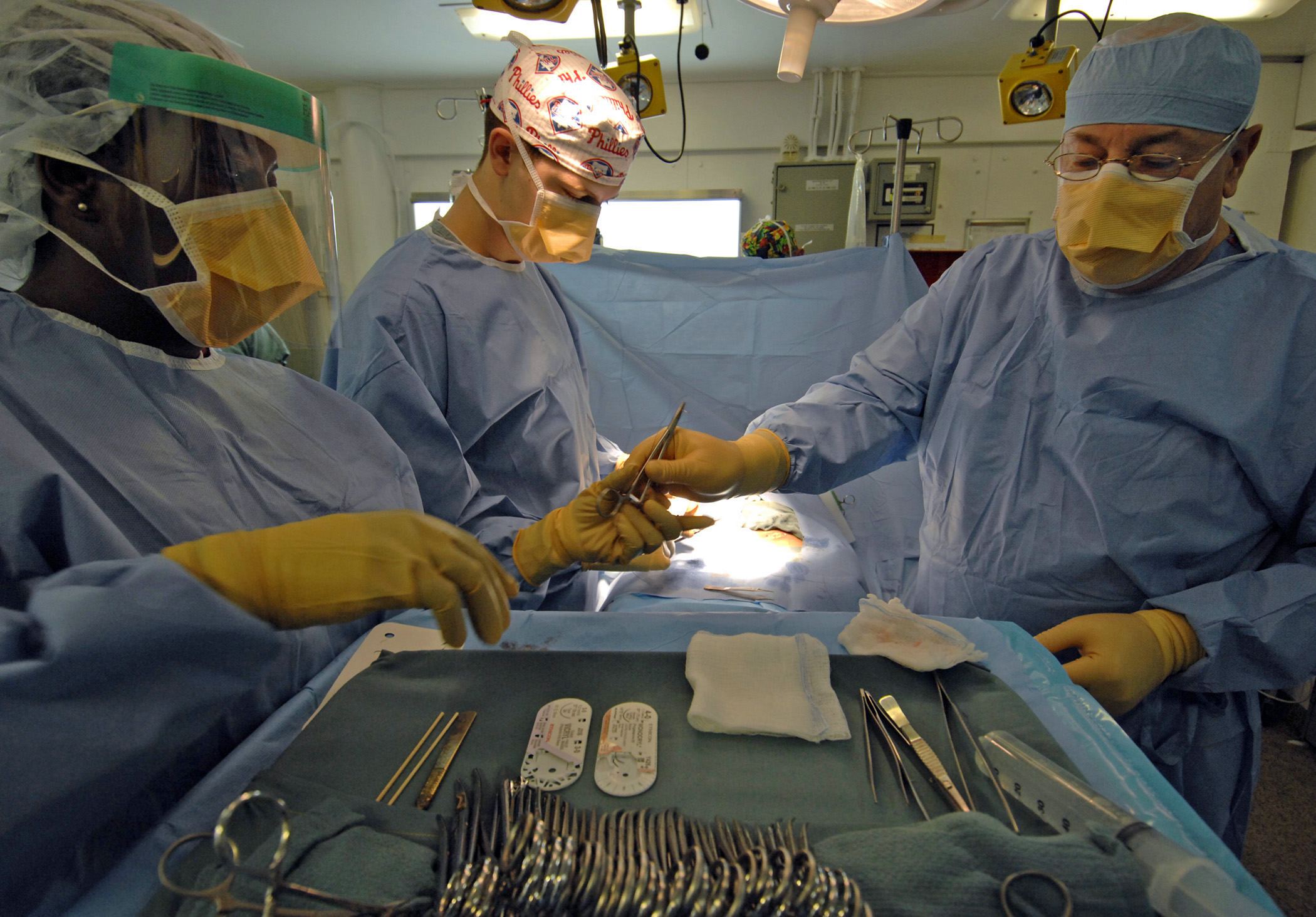
Surgery in progress with a surgeon, surgeon's assistant and a surgical technologist visible; the anesthesia provider is just visible behind the surgical drape

A surgeon's assistant, also known as a surgical assistant, assistant in surgery or first assistant, is a healthcare professional who provides direct manual and/or instrumental assistance to meet the in-procedure demands of a surgeon during a surgical operation. Most surgical assistants are trainee surgeons or junior doctors, but In the United Kingdom, a surgical care practitioner, who is not a qualified doctor, may perform simple surgical operations under the supervision of one.

In the United States, the American College of Surgeons supports the concept that, ideally, the first assistant at the operating table should be a qualified surgeon or a resident in an approved surgical training program. Residents who have appropriate levels of training should be provided with opportunities to assist and participate in operations. If such assistants are unavailable, other physicians who are experienced in assisting may participate or a qualified practitioner licensed in the role of surgical assistant. The American College of Surgeons maintains that a physician who assists with an operation should be trained to participate in and actively assist the surgeon in safely completing the operation. When a surgeon is unavailable to serve as an assistant, a qualified surgical resident or other qualified health care professional, such as a nurse practitioner or physician assistant with experience in assisting, may participate in operations, according to the ACS Statements on Principles. A qualified practitioner is defined as any licensed practitioner with sufficient training to conduct a delegated portion of a procedure without the need for more experienced supervision, according to the ACS Statements on Principles. The U.S. Bureau of Labor defines surgical assistants as individuals that assist in operations, under the supervision of surgeons. They may, in accordance with state laws, help surgeons to make incisions and close surgical sites, manipulate or remove tissues, implant surgical devices or drains, suction the surgical site, place catheters, clamp or cauterize vessels or tissue, and apply dressings.
