= Robert E. Strahorn =

American journalist, war correspondent, railroad executive

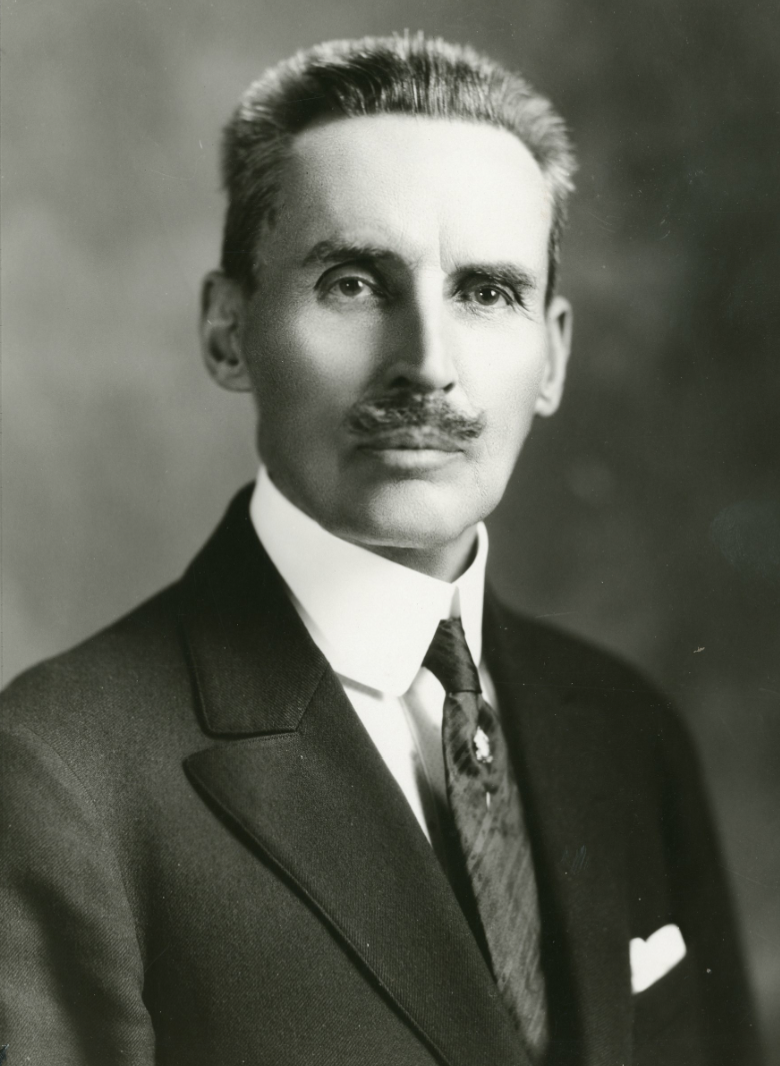
- Born: May 15, 1852; Centre County, Pennsylvania, US
- Died: March 31, 1944 (aged 91); San Francisco, California, US
- Occupation(s): Journalist, Businessman

Robert Edmund Strahorn (May 15, 1852 – March 31, 1944) was a journalist, war correspondent, railroad promoter, and businessman active primarily in the 19th-century American West. In his early career he was a correspondent during the Great Sioux War.

== Career ==
Robert Edmund Strahorn, born on May 15, 1852, in Centre County, Pennsylvania, moved with his family to Illinois and then Missouri at a young age. Later in life, he wrote an eyewitness account of seeing Abraham Lincoln at the Lincoln-Douglas debates in 1858. At age eighteen, a doctor advised Strahorn to move west to the Rocky Mountains for health reasons. Strahorn established himself in Colorado, working for papers such as Denver's Rocky Mountain News, and from there became a reporter during the Great Sioux War of 1876-1877. He participated in the Battle of Powder River and Battle of the Rosebud and produced eyewitness accounts of both actions. Strahorn then led the publicity department of the Union Pacific Railroad from 1877 to 1883. He was an important figure in building the Oregon Short Line Railroad from Granger, Wyoming to Huntington, Oregon, which established several cities and towns along the route including Caldwell, Idaho. He founded the North Coast Railroad, later merged into the Seattle and North Coast Railroad, building hundreds of miles of railroad in Washington State. Strahorn was a founder and trustee of the College of Idaho in Caldwell. Strahorn died on March 31, 1944, in San Francisco, California.

== Personal life ==
Strahorn married twice but had no children. He is buried in a mausoleum at Riverside Memorial Park in Spokane, Washington next to his wives.
