= Fort Fetterman =

Coordinates: 42°50′25″N 105°28′47″W

- U.S. National Register of Historic Places
- Location within Wyoming Location within the United States
- Nearest city: Orpha, Wyoming
- Area: 70 acres (28 ha)
- Built: 1867
- Architectural style: Log cabin style
- NRHP reference No.: 69000187
- Added to NRHP: April 16, 1969

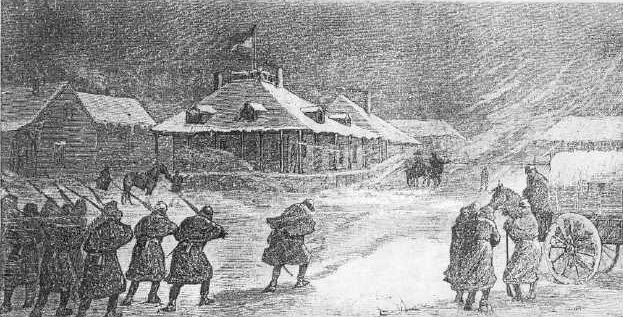
General Crook's Headquarters, Fort Fetterman. Etching from Harper's Weekly, December 16, 1876

Fort Fetterman was constructed in 1867 by the United States Army on the Great Plains frontier in Dakota Territory, approximately 11 miles northwest of present-day Douglas, Wyoming. Located high on the bluffs south of the North Platte River, it served as a major base for the start of several United States military expeditions against warring Native American tribes. The fort is listed on the National Register of Historic Places.

== History ==
Fort Fetterman was built as a major supply point for the United States army's operations in the area. Established on July 19, 1867, by Companies A, C, H, and I of the 4th U.S. Infantry under the command of Major William E. Dye, the fort was named in honor of Captain William J. Fetterman, who was killed in a battle with Indians near Fort Phil Kearny on December 21, 1866.

"It contained quarters for three hundred enlisted men, and the necessary officers; the various magazines and store-houses required for the preservation of ammunition, rations and other supplies; a hospital with fifteen beds; stables for fifty horses; a corral capable of holding fifty-six mule wagons, with their animals; a theatre, an ice-house, a root-house, a granary, a bake-house, blacksmith shops, saw-mill, saddlers' shop, paint shop, laundresses' quarters and a steam engine for pumping water from the North Platte River."

With the completion of Fort Fetterman, the army abandoned Fort Caspar and moved its garrison into the new fort in August. As it was on the south side of the Platte, Fort Fetterman was excluded from the provisions of the 1868 Treaty of Fort Laramie, which resulted in the US abandonment of all forts further to the north: forts Reno, Phil Kearny, and C.F. Smith). Thus, Fort Fetterman became the northernmost military post in eastern Wyoming. It was important to the protection of the Bozeman Trail and other routes for settlers.

Given its remote location, the post was not considered a desirable station. Desertions by soldiers were frequent, and the winters long and hard. Supplies had to be brought in by wagon from Fort Laramie to the southeast or from Medicine Bow Station on the railroad. Soldiers had to carry water up the steep bluffs from the river or nearby creek. The soil proved to be unsuitable for sustaining gardens, so fresh vegetables were not available.

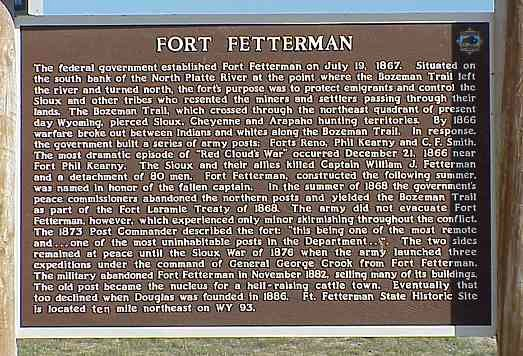
Fort Fetterman historical marker

In 1876, during the Great Sioux War with the Lakota, Cheyenne, and Arapaho tribes, the monotony of garrison duty at Fetterman was broken by a series of major military expeditions that set out from the fort. The Big Horn Expedition, which included three of the post's four companies under the command of Colonel Joseph J. Reynolds, culminated in a defeat at the Battle of Powder River in March. The Yellowstone Expedition led by Brigadier General George Crook engaged in the Battle of Rosebud in June, and the Powder River Expedition under Colonel Ranald S. Mackenzie destroyed a Cheyenne village in November during the Dull Knife Fight. Fort Fetterman remained active until 1882, when it was abandoned by the Army as the Indian Wars had subsided.

A small community (Fetterman City) was started around the empty fort by Charles Henry King and others as an outfitting point for area ranchers and for wagon trains. When the town of Douglas was established eleven miles away in 1886, Fetterman City rapidly declined.

== State Historic Site ==
The old fort deteriorated from neglect. Today, the partially restored site is listed on the National Register of Historic Places and is administered as an historic site by the State of Wyoming. Visitors can walk an interpretive trail to view the ruins of the fort's buildings. An officers' quarters and an ordnance warehouse have been restored and contain exhibits, artifacts and dioramas about the fort's history, Fetterman City and area Native Americans.

== See also ==
- Wyoming Historical Landmarks
- List of the oldest buildings in Wyoming

== References and links ==
- Fort Fetterman
- Wyoming Tales and Trails
