= General Brooks =

General Brooks may refer to:

- Allison Brooks (1917–2006), U.S. Air Force major general
- Dallas Brooks (1896–1966), British Army general
- Edward H. Brooks (1893–1978), U.S. Army lieutenant general
- Horace Brooks (1814–1894), Union army brevet brigadier general
- Leo A. Brooks Jr. (born 1957), U.S. Army brigadier general
- Leo A. Brooks Sr. (born 1932), U.S. Army major general
- Micah Brooks (1775–1857), New York State Infantry major general
- T. B. Henderson Brooks (1909–1997), British Indian Army lieutenant general
- Theodore Marley Brooks, fictional brigadier general in Doc Savage media
- Vincent K. Brooks (born 1958), U.S. Army four-star general
- William T. H. Brooks (1821–1870), Union Army major general

== See also ==
- Simon Brooks-Ward (fl. 1980s–2020s), British Army major general
