= Leo Brooks =

Leo Brooks may refer to:

- Leo Brooks (American football) (1947–2002), American football defensive lineman
- Leo A. Brooks Sr. (born 1932), United States Army major general
- Leo A. Brooks Jr. (born 1957), United States Army brigadier general

== See also ==
- Lee Brooks (born 1983), composer and sound designer for film
- Lee Brookes (born 1968), British racing driver
