= List of commandants of cadets of the United States Military Academy =

Logo of the Military Academy

The Commandant of Cadets is the ranking officer in charge of the Corps of Cadets at the United States Military Academy at West Point, New York. The commandant is head of the Department of Tactics and, under the superintendent of the academy is responsible for the administration, discipline, and military training of cadets at the academy. A model for all cadets, the commandant is an academy graduate of impeccable character and bearing who has demonstrated accomplishment in both academic excellence and active military service in the field.

During the superintendency of Sylvanus Thayer, the corps of cadets was organized into a battalion of two companies with an officer of the army appointed as commander. In 1825, the office was designated as commandant of cadets. William J. Worth was the first officer to bear the title, though he had assumed the office several years previously, following three earlier battalion commanding officers.

Referring to the office in his work on Commandant Emory Upton, academy professor Peter Michie wrote: "His example should be that of the ideal soldier, officer, and gentleman. He should cultivate soldierly honor among the cadets until it attains vigorous growth. He should rebuke with severity the first tendency to prevarication or dishonesty in word or act. With a system of divided responsibility, which ultimately rests on one or two comrades, he should control all by strict and increasing exactions. To make his government successful he should be endowed with the highest soldierly qualities in personal bearing at drill, and even in every act while subject to vision of his corps"

== Commandants ==
#	Start	End	Name	Class year	Notability	References
1	1817	1818	George W. Gardiner	1814	Killed in Dade's Massacre (second in command of the force under Major Dade)	
2	1818	1819	John Bliss	—		
3	1819	1820	John R. Bell	1812		
4	1820	1828	William J. Worth	—		
5	1829	1833	Ethan Allen Hitchcock	1817	Union Major General	
6	1833	1838	John Fowle	—		
7	1838	1842	Charles Ferguson Smith	1825	Union Major General	
8	1842	1845	John Addison Thomas	1833		
9	1845	1852	Bradford Ripley Alden	1831		
10	1852	1854	Robert S. Garnett	1841	Confederate Brigadier General; killed in the Battle of Corrick's Ford	
11	1854	1856	William H.T. Walker	1837	Confederate Major General; killed in the Battle of Atlanta	
12	1856	1860	William J. Hardee	1838	Confederate Lieutenant General	
13	1860	1861	John F. Reynolds	1841	Union Major General; killed in the Battle of Gettysburg	
14	1861	1861	Christopher C. Augur	1843	Union Major General	
15	1861	1862	Kenner Garrard	1851	Union Brigadier General	
16	1862	1864	Henry B. Clitz	1845		
17	1864	1864	John C. Tidball	1848		
18	1864	1870	Henry M. Black	1847		
19	1870	1875	Emory Upton	1861	Union Brigadier General	
20	1875	1879	Thomas H. Neill	1847	Union Brigadier General	
21	1879	1882	Henry M. Lazelle	1855		
22	1882	1888	Henry C. Hasbrouck	1861		
23	1888	1892	Hamilton S. Hawkins	—	Member of the class of 1856; did not graduate	
24	1892	1897	Samuel M. Mills	1865		
25	1897	1901	Otto L. Hein	1870		
26	1901	1905	Charles G. Treat	1882		
27	1905	1909	Robert L. Howze	1888	Medal of Honor recipient	
28	1909	1911	Frederick W. Sibley	1874		
29	1911	1914	Fred Winchester Sladen	1890	Superintendent of the United States Military Academy (1922-1926)	
30	1914	1916	Morton F. Smith	1895		
31	1916	1918	Guy Vernor Henry	1898	Bronze medallist in Team eventing at the 1912 Summer Olympics	
32	1918	1919	Jens Bugge	1895		
33	1919	1923	Robert M. Danford	1904		
34	1923	1926	Merch B. Stewart	1896	Superintendent of the United States Military Academy (1926-1928)	
35	1926	1929	Campbell B. Hodges	1903		
36	1929	1933	Robert C. Richardson	1904		
37	1933	1936	Simon Bolivar Buckner	1908		
38	1936	1937	Dennis E. McCunniff	1913		
39	1937	1941	Charles W. Ryder	1915		
40	1941	1942	Frederick A. Irving	1917	Superintendent of the United States Military Academy (1951-1954)	
41	1942	1943	Philip E. Gallagher	1918		
42	1943	1946	George B. Honnen	1920		
43	1946	1948	Gerald J. Higgins	1934		
44	1948	1951	Paul D. Harkins	1929		
45	1951	1952	John K. Waters	1931		
46	1952	1954	John H. Michaelis	1936		
47	1954	1956	Edwin J. Messinger	1931		
48	1956	1959	John L. Throckmorton	1935		
49	1959	1961	Charles W. G. Rich	1935		
50	1961	1963	Richard G. Stilwell	1938		
51	1963	1965	Michael S. Davison	1939		
52	1965	1967	Richard P. Scott	1941		
53	1967	1969	Bernard W. Rogers	1943		
54	1969	1972	Sam S. Walker	1946		
55	1972	1975	Philip R. Feir	1949		
56	1975	1977	Walter F. Ulmer	1952		
57	1977	1979	John C. Bard	1954		
58	1979	1982	Joseph P. Franklin	1955		
59	1982	1984	John H. Moellering	1959		
60	1984	1987	Peter J. Boylan	1961		
61	1987	1989	Fred A. Gorden	1962		
62	1989	1992	David A. Bramlett	1964		
63	1992	1994	Robert F. Foley	1963	Medal of Honor recipient	
64	1994	1995	Freddy E. McFarren	1966		
65	1995	1997	Robert J. St. Onge	1969		
66	1997	1999	John P. Abizaid	1973		
67	1999	2002	Eric Olson	1972		
68	2002	2004	Leo A. Brooks	1979		
69	2004	2006	Curtis M. Scaparrotti	1978		
70	2006	2008	Robert L. Caslen	1975	Superintendent of the United States Military Academy (2013-2018)	
71	2008	2009	Michael S. Linnington	1980		
72	2009	2011	William E. Rapp	1984		
73	2011	2012	Theodore D. Martin	1983		
74	2012	2014	Richard Clarke	1984		
75	2014	2016	John Thomson	1986		
76	2016	2017	Diana Holland	1990		
77	2017	2019	Steven Gilland	1990	Superintendent of the United States Military Academy (2022-present)	
78	2019	2021	Curtis Buzzard	1992		
79	2021	2023	Mark Quander	1995		
80	2023	2024	Lori Robinson	1994		
81	2024	2026	R.J. Garcia	1996		
82	2026	present	Joseph Katz	1999		

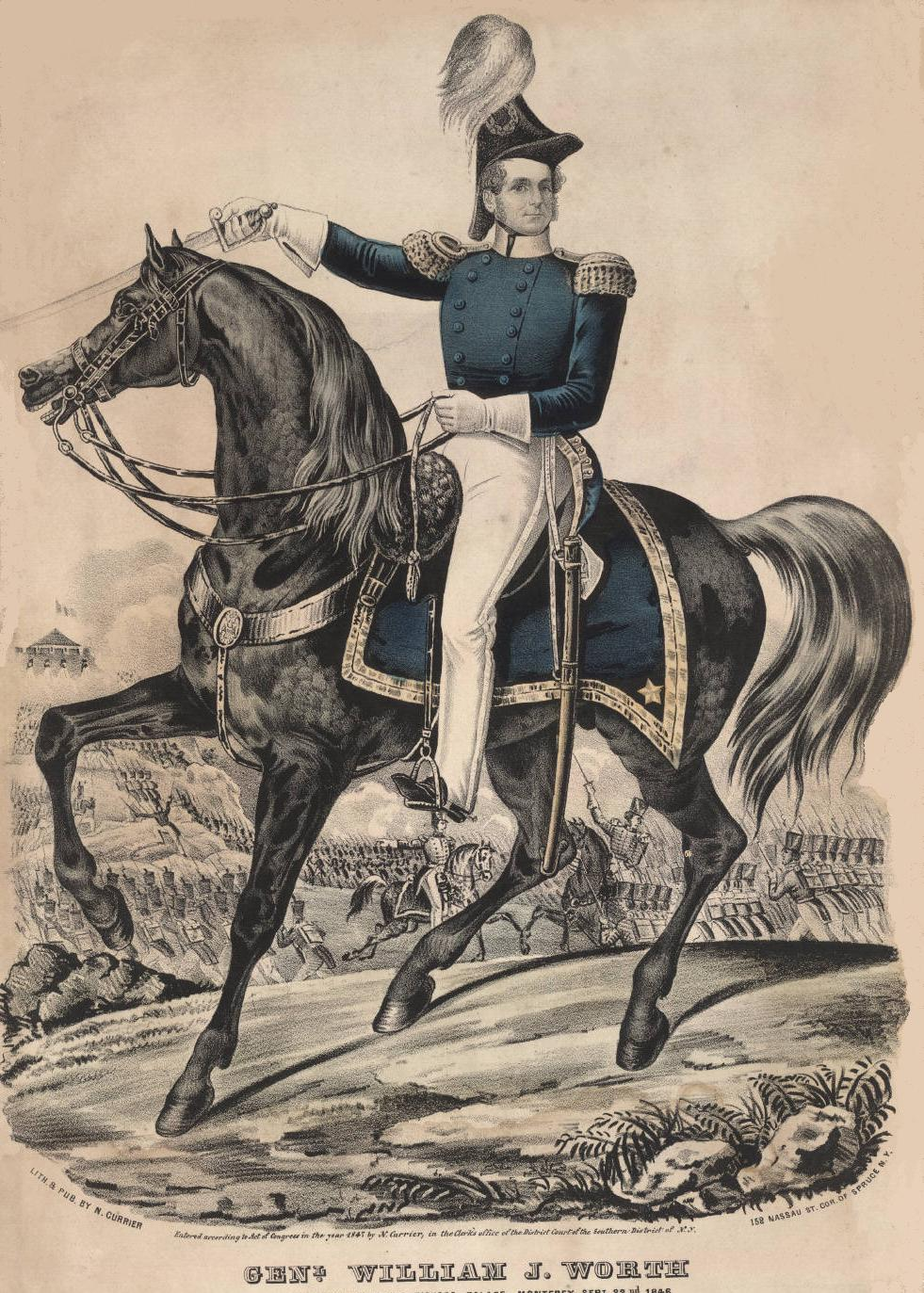
William J. Worth

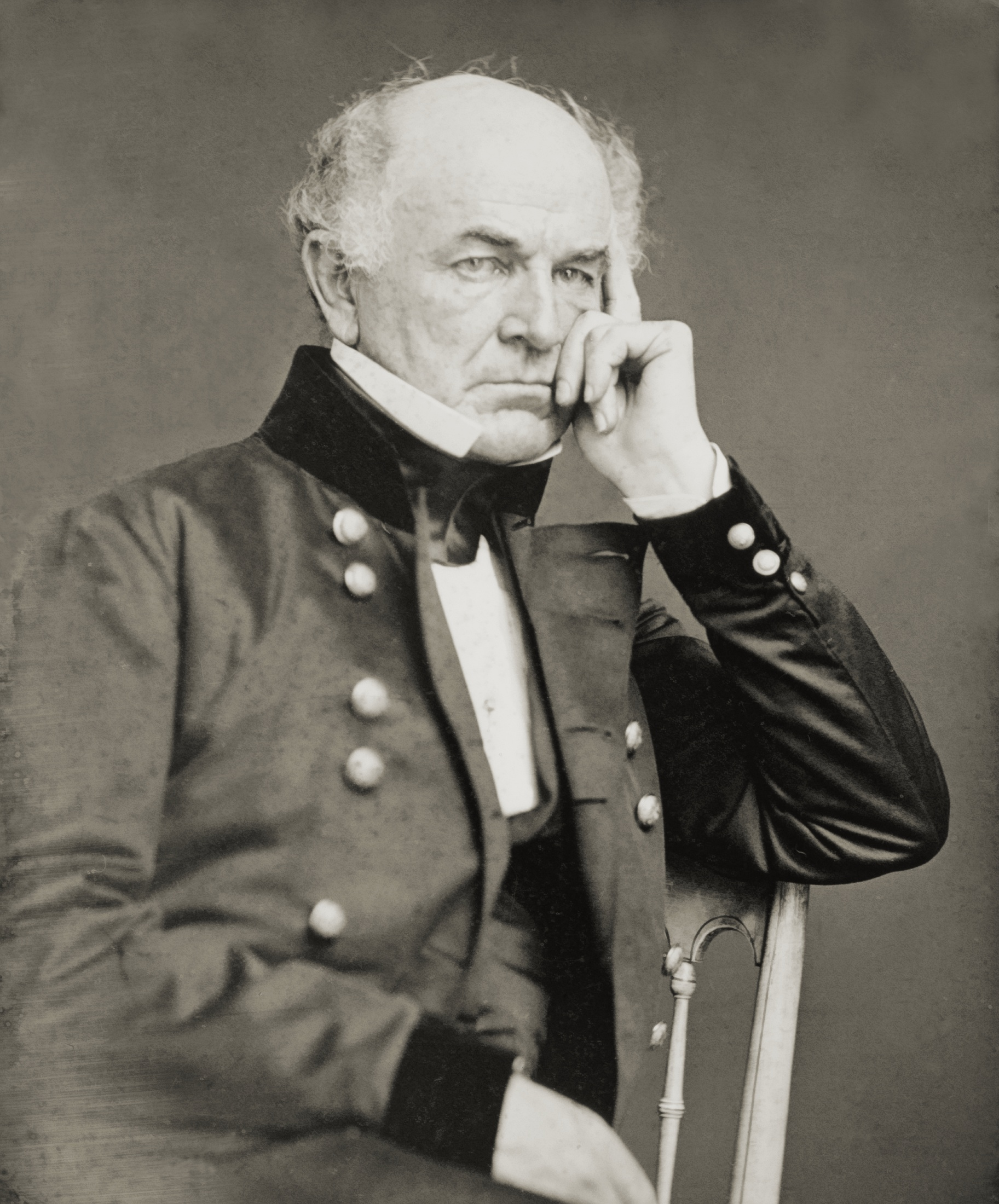
Ethan A. Hitchcock

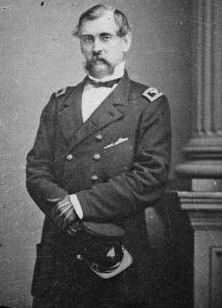
Charles Ferguson Smith

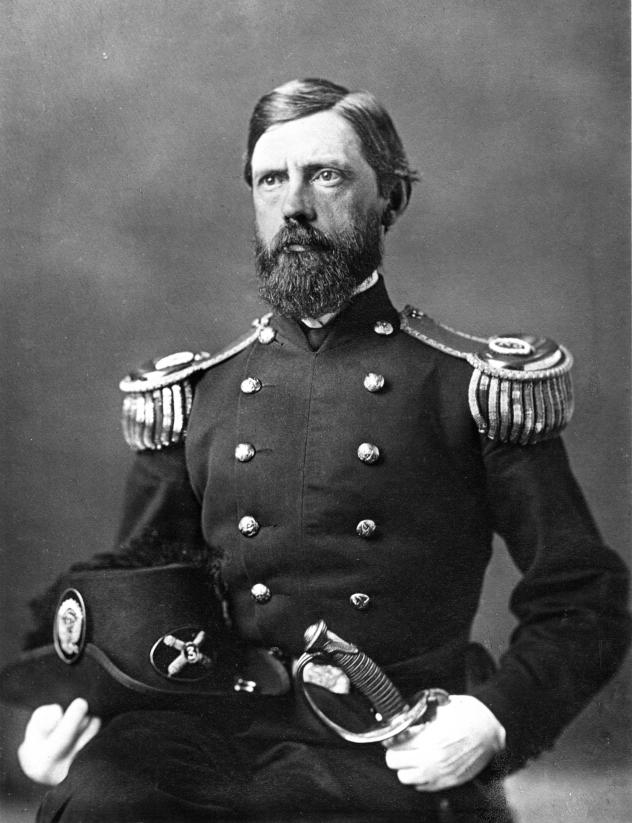
John F. Reynolds

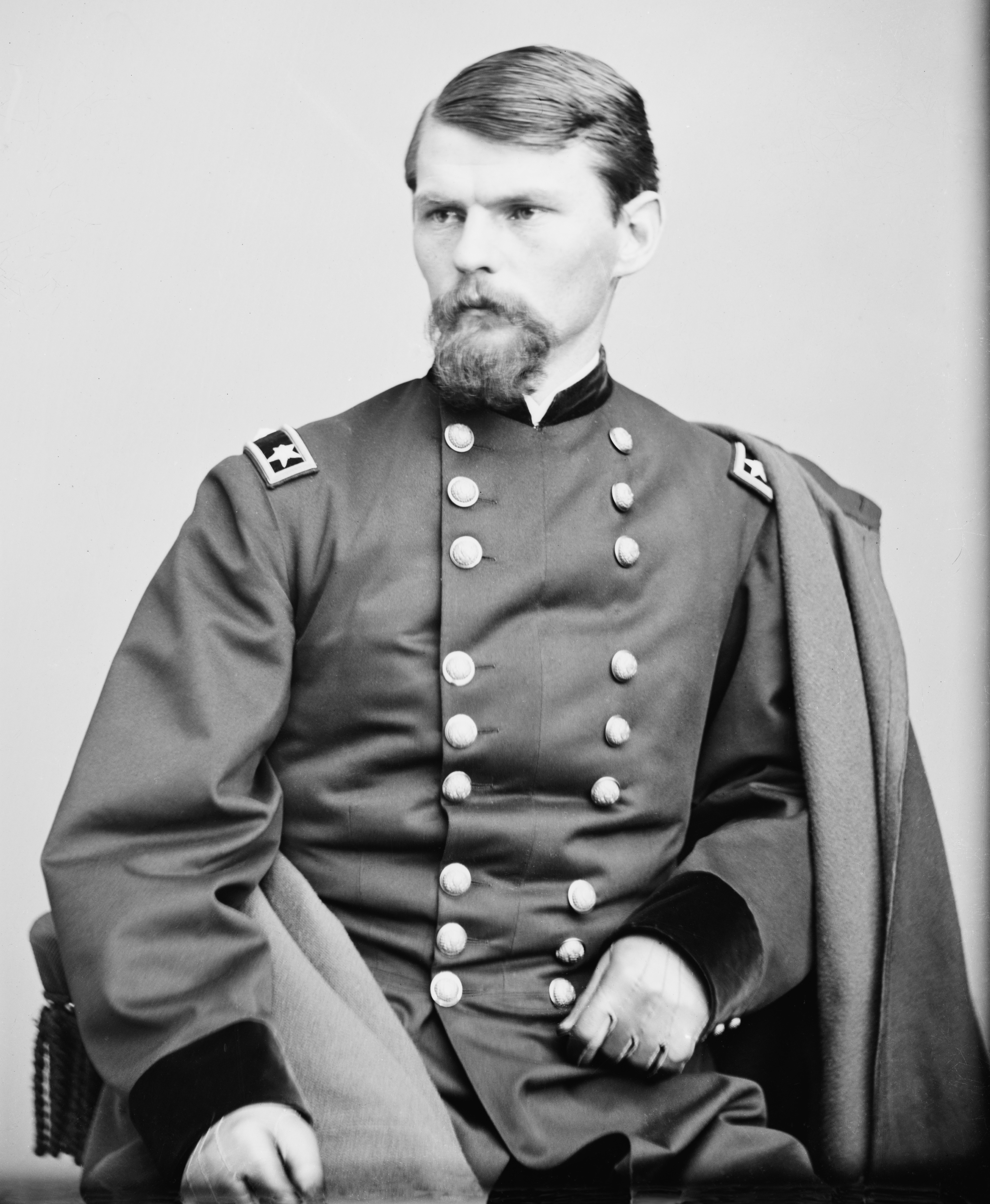
Emory Upton

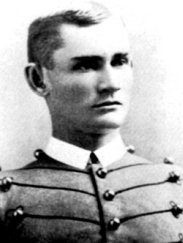
Robert L. Howze

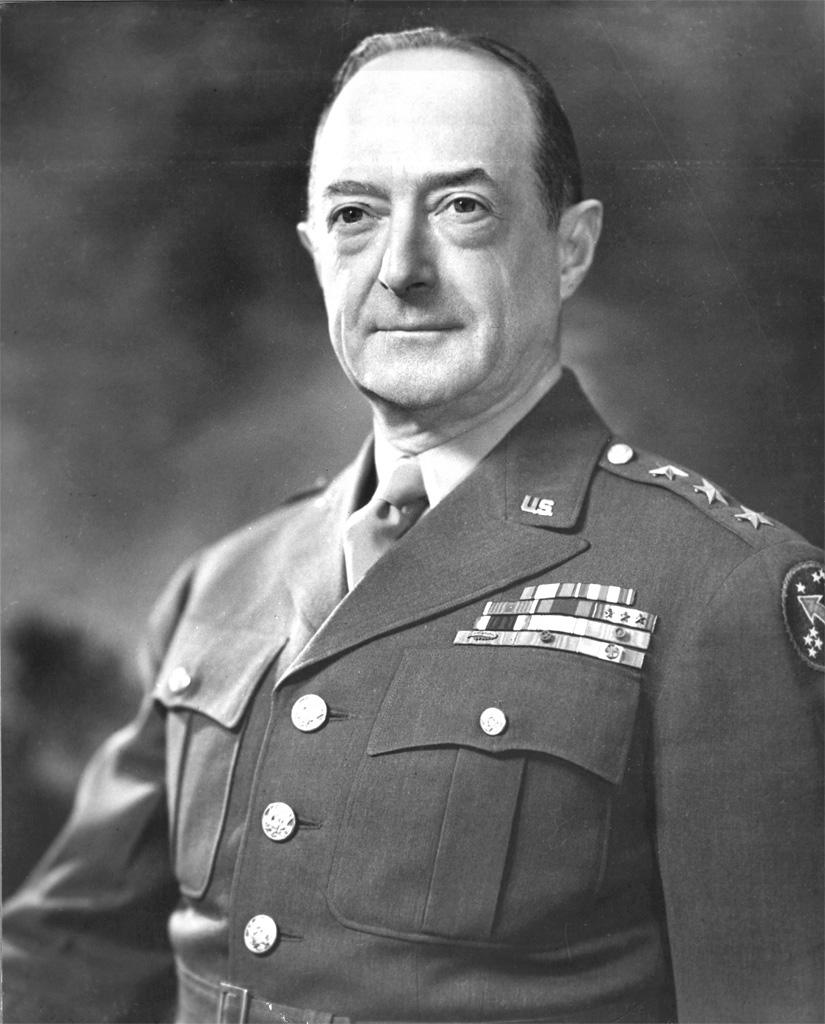
Robert C. Richardson

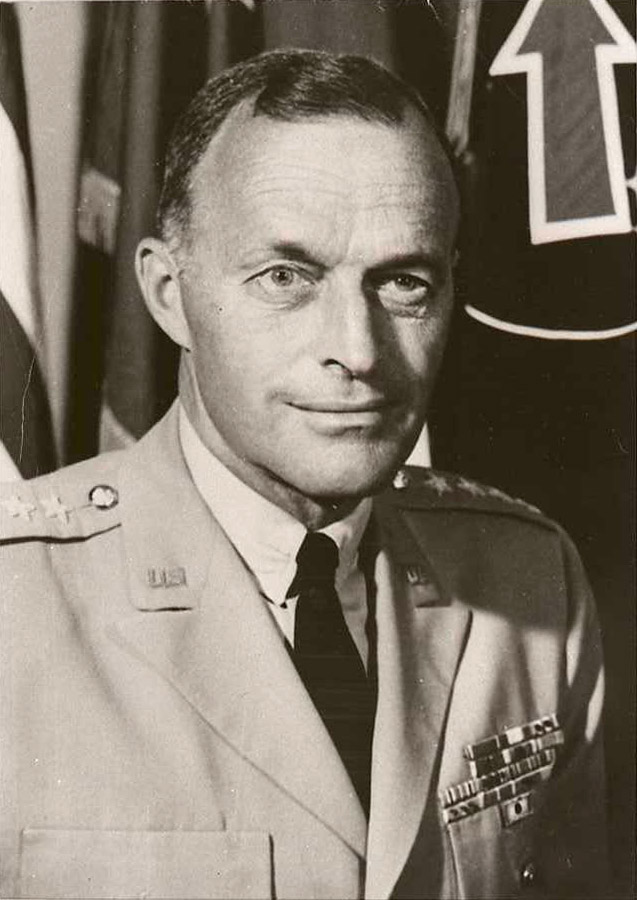
John K. Waters

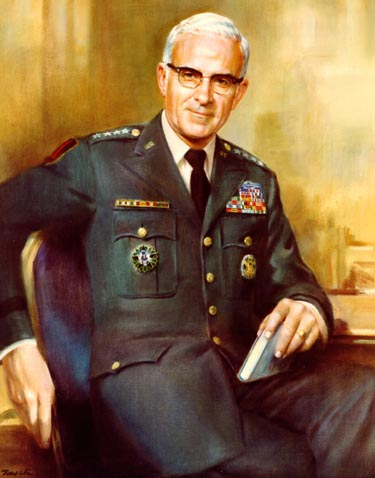
Bernard W. Rogers

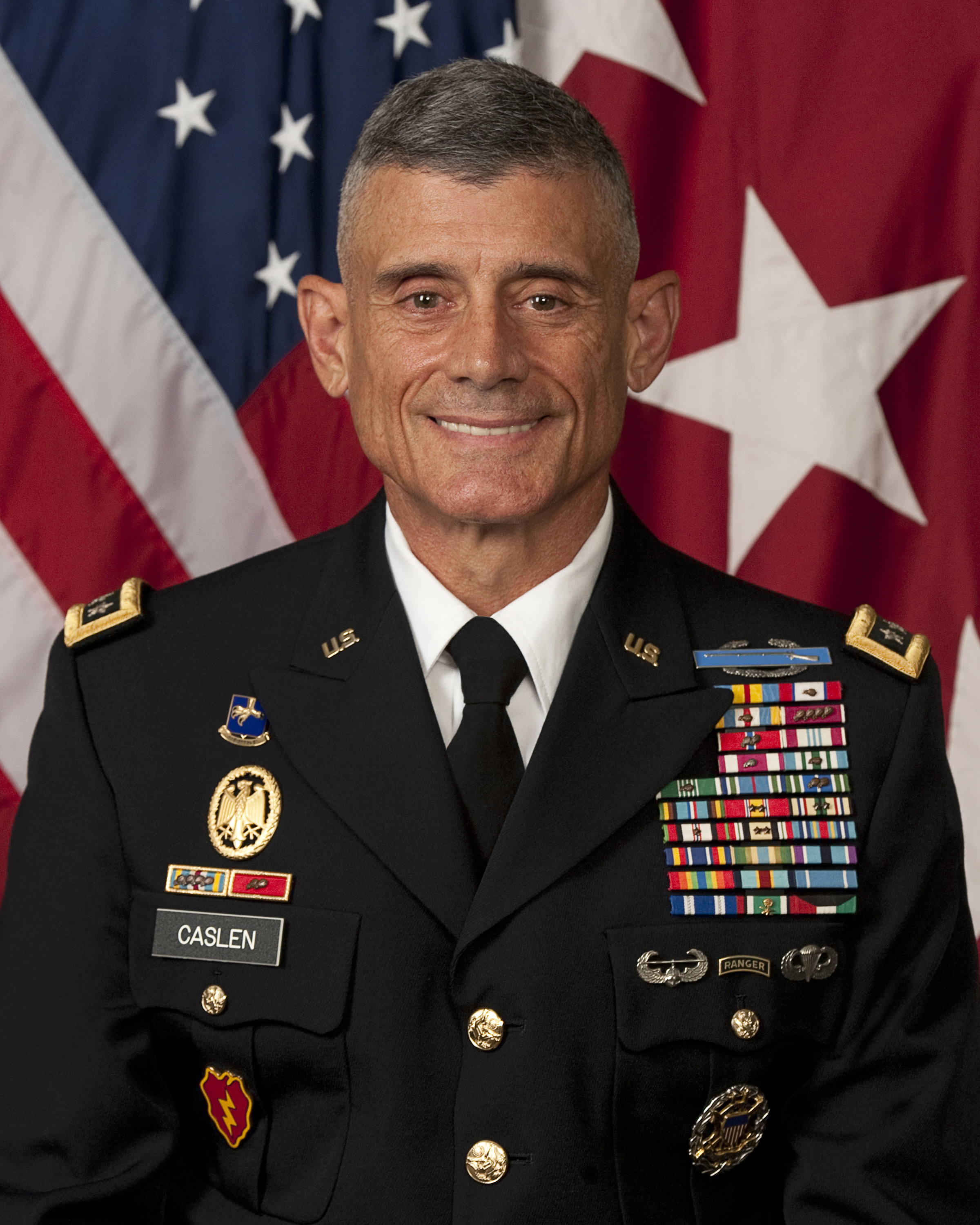
Robert Caslen
