= Mark Quander =

U.S. Army general (born 1974)

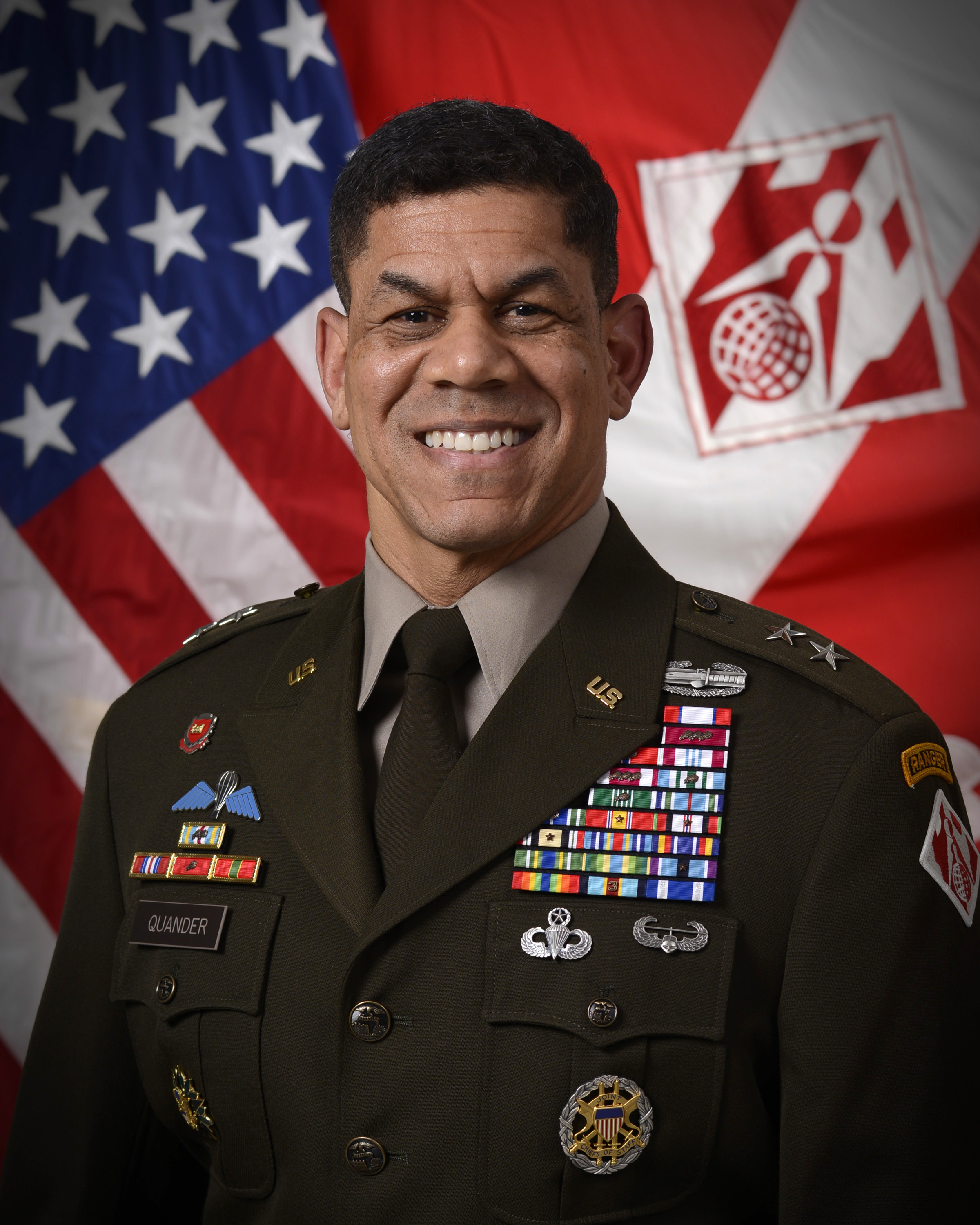
- Official portrait, 2024
- Born: 1974 (age 51–52)
- Alma mater: United States Military Academy (BS); Missouri University of Science and Technology (MS); Georgetown University (MA)
- Spouse: LTC (ret.) Melonie Quander (m. 2000)
- Relatives: MG Leo A. Brooks Sr. (uncle); GEN Vincent K. Brooks (cousin); BG Leo A. Brooks Jr. (cousin)
- Military career
- Allegiance: United States of America
- Branch: United States Army
- Service years: 1995–present
- Rank: Major General
- Commands: Great Lakes and Ohio River Division; Commandant of Cadets of the United States Military Academy; Transatlantic Division, United States Army Corps of Engineers; United States Army Engineer School
- Awards: Army Distinguished Service Medal; Legion of Merit (4); Bronze Star Medal (3)

Mark Christopher Quander (born 1974) is a United States Army major general who has served as the deputy commanding general for military and international operations of the United States Army Corps of Engineers since July 2025. He most recently served as the commanding general of the Great Lakes and Ohio River Division from 2023 to 2025. He previously served as the 79th commandant of cadets of the United States Military Academy from 2021 to 2023, as the 98th commandant of the United States Army Engineer School from 2019 to 2021 and as commander of the Transatlantic Division of the United States Army Corps of Engineers from 2018 to 2019.

He also is a member of the historic Quander family, a family of African Americans with their ancestor having been brought to America sometime in the late 17th century.

== Education ==
A native of Fayetteville, North Carolina, Quander was commissioned as an engineer officer via the United States Military Academy, graduating with a B.S. degree in civil engineering. He also holds an M.S. degree in Engineering Management from the University of Missouri-Rolla and a M.A. degree in Public Policy from Georgetown University.

== Military career ==
In December 2023, Quander was promoted to major general.

== Personal life ==
Quander is married to retired lieutenant colonel Melonie Quander, an Army nurse who served in the Iraq War. His promotion to brigadier general in February 2020 made him the fourth member of his extended family to attain general officer rank, after his cousins Vincent Brooks, Leo Brooks Jr., and his uncle Leo Brooks Sr.

Military offices
Preceded by David C. Hill	Commanding General of the Transatlantic Division of the United States Army Corps of Engineers; 2018–2019	Succeeded by Christopher G. Beck
Preceded by Robert F. Whittle Jr.	Commandant of the United States Army Engineer School; 2019–2021	Succeeded by Daniel H. Hibner
Preceded by Curtis A. Buzzard	Commandant of Cadets of the United States Military Academy; 2021–2023	Succeeded by Lori L. Robinson
Preceded by Kimberly A. Peeples	Commanding General of the Great Lakes and Ohio River Division of the United States Army Corps of Engineers; 2023–2025	Succeeded by Jayson H. Putnam; Acting
Preceded by Kirk E. Gibbs	Deputy Commanding General for Military and International Operations of the United States Army Corps of Engineers; 2025–present	Incumbent
