= Ronald F. Lewis =

US Army general, former assistant to the Secretary of Defense

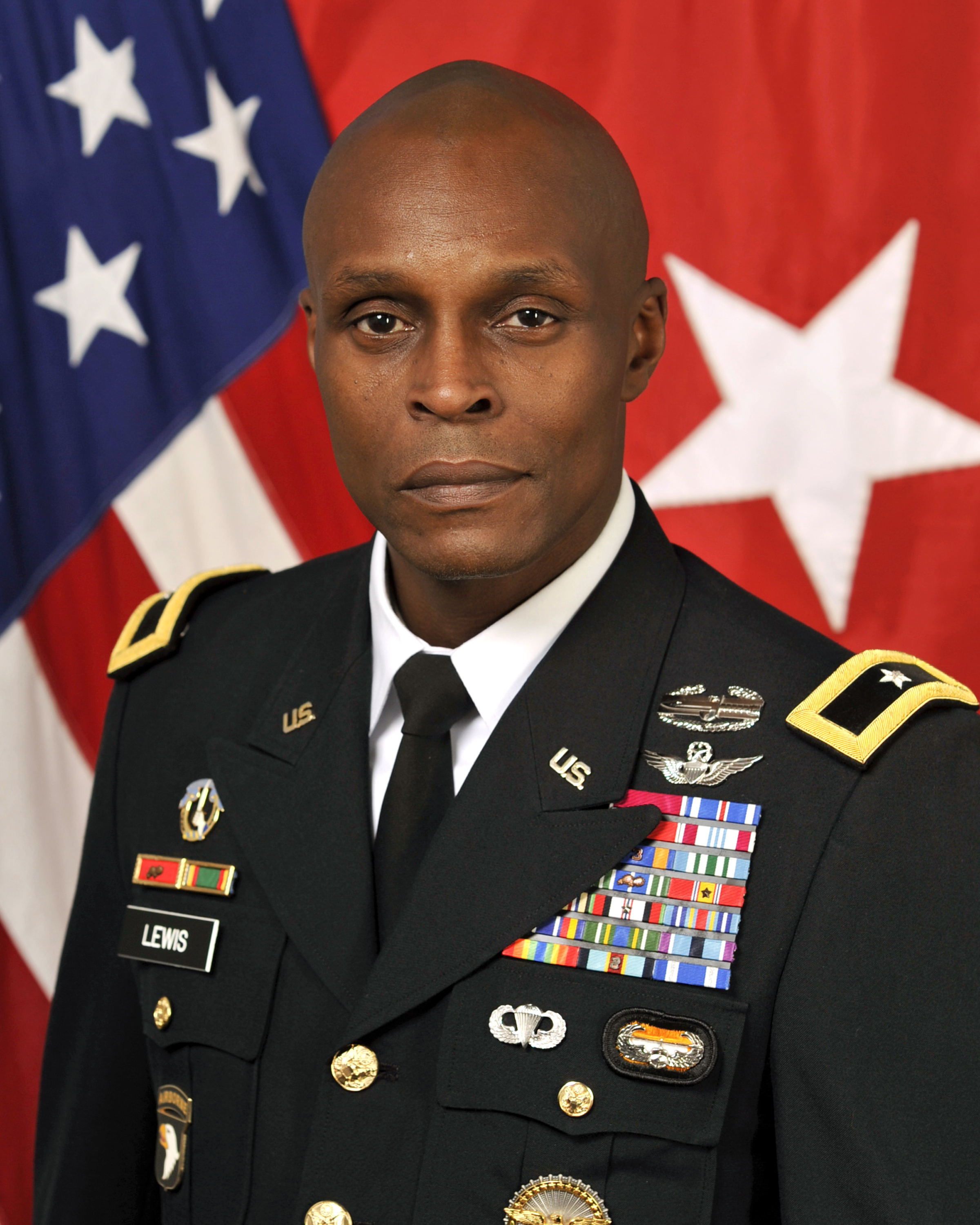
- Lewis as a brigadier general
- Born: 1966 (age 59–60); Kittery, Maine, U.S.
- Alma mater: United States Military Academy (BS); Naval War College (MNSS)
- Children: 2
- Military career
- Allegiance: United States
- Branch: United States Army
- Service years: 1987-2017
- Rank: Lieutenant General (demoted to Brigadier General)
- Commands: Chief of Army Public Affairs; 159th Combat Aviation Brigade; 1st Battalion, 227th Aviation Regiment
- Conflicts: Iraq War; War in Afghanistan
- Awards: Defense Distinguished Service Medal; Legion of Merit; Distinguished Flying Cross; Bronze Star Medal; Army Stars and Stripes Award

Ronald Flynn Lewis (born 1966) is a former three-star general in the United States Army, retroactively demoted to brigadier general. He last served as special assistant to Vice Chief of Staff of the United States Army Daniel B. Allyn, and prior to that was the senior military assistant to United States Secretary of Defense Ash Carter from April to November 2015.

== Early life and education ==
Lewis was born in Kittery, Maine to Richard and Emma Lewis, the former being a retired United States Air Force sergeant with 12 years of military service. He was raised in Chicago, Illinois and graduated from Vanderpoel Elementary School and later Mendel Catholic Preparatory High School before proceeding to West Point in 1983. He graduated from West Point with a Bachelor of Science in mechanical engineering. Lewis was a student in the United States Naval War College from 2006 to 2007, where he received a master's degree in national security and strategic studies.

== Military career ==
Lt. Gen. Mark Milley (left), then the commander of the International Security Assistance Force Joint Command, speaks with Brig. Gen. Lewis (right) at Forward Operating Base Gamberi in Laghman province, Afghanistan, 22 May 2013

Lewis was commissioned into the Army as a second lieutenant in May 1987. Notable individuals in his class include Edward M. Daly (commander of United States Army Materiel Command), David Mikolaities (adjutant general of New Hampshire) and John H. Moellering Jr. (son of retired general John H. Moellering). Initially intending to become an infantry officer, a mentor inspired him to join the aviation branch instead.

Lewis had three combat tours in Iraq and Afghanistan as part of the 101st Airborne Division. His command assignments include being commander of the 159th Combat Aviation Brigade from 2008 to 2012. In Afghanistan, Lewis was deputy commanding general for support of the 101st Airborne Division, dual-hatted as deputy commanding general for support of Regional Command East from 2012 to 2014.

Lewis later became military assistant to Ash Carter three times - when Carter was Under Secretary of Defense for Acquisition, Technology and Logistics, Deputy Secretary of Defense and finally Secretary of Defense. He also served as a member of Carter's SecDef transition team, introducing him to key senators and preparing him for his Senate confirmation hearing. He was chief of Army public affairs from 2014 to 2015, promoting to major general on 7 January 2014.

General James C. McConville was his commanding officer on all three of his combat deployments. McConville praised Lewis as "extremely competent" and "exactly the type of leader that we want at the highest levels of the Army". One of Lewis's mentors, former Army vice chief of staff Richard A. Cody commented that his protégé was an unambitious but principled officer, not "worried about the next rung on the ladder" but "worried about doing the right thing every day."

=== Retirement and demotion ===
On 12 November 2015, Lewis was relieved as senior military assistant to Secretary Carter and reassigned as a special assistant to then Vice Chief of Staff of the Army Daniel B. Allyn. Carter cited "alleged misconduct" as the reason for his firing and directed the Inspector General to investigate the matter. Due to no longer holding a three-star position, Lewis was reverted to his permanent rank of major general.

The IG investigation concluded in October 2016 that Lewis had demonstrated conduct "unbecoming an officer and a gentleman on multiple occasions" while serving as Carter's military assistant. Such practices included using a government credit card to pay for bills in strip clubs in Rome and South Korea, spending more than US$1,000 on excessive drinking while on duty and engaging in inappropriate relationships with female subordinates. Lewis was also determined to have made false statements to the department in service of other acts of misconduct, claiming his government credit card had been stolen while on duty in South Korea.

As a result of the investigation, Lewis was given an official reprimand by General Allyn and by direction of then Army Secretary Eric Fanning demoted to the retirement rank of brigadier general, which was determined to be the last rank in which he satisfactorily served. His retirement pay was summarily slashed by $20,000, leaving him approximately $80,000 after taxes in his first year of retirement.

== Personal life ==
Lewis is married with two children, including a son named R.J., who in 2015 was a student at East-West University in Chicago.

== Awards and decorations ==
In addition to the below awards, Lewis is also the 2013 recipient of the Army Stars and Stripes Award, which he received in February 2013 during the 27th annual Black Engineer of the Year Awards Global Competitiveness Conference.

Left Side

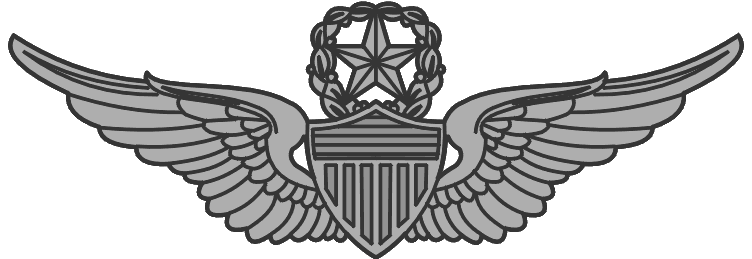

Badge	Combat Action Badge		
Badge	Army Master Aviator Badge		
1st row	Defense Distinguished Service Medal		
2nd row	Army Distinguished Service Medal	Legion of Merit	Distinguished Flying Cross
3rd row	Soldier's Medal	Bronze Star Medal	Defense Meritorious Service Medal
4th row	Meritorious Service Medal	Air Medal with numeral "3" device	Joint Service Commendation Medal
5th row	Army Commendation Medal	Army Achievement Medal with two bronze oak leaf clusters	National Defense Service Medal with bronze service star
6th row	Southwest Asia Service Medal	Afghanistan Campaign Medal with bronze service star	Global War on Terrorism Expeditionary Medal
7th row	Global War on Terrorism Service Medal	Armed Forces Service Medal	Humanitarian Service Medal
8th row	Army Service Ribbon	Army Overseas Service Ribbon with numeral "2" device	NATO Medal (non-Article 5 version)
Badges	Air Assault Badge	Basic Parachutist Badge	Office of the Secretary of Defense Identification Badge

Right Side

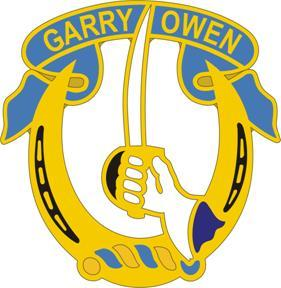
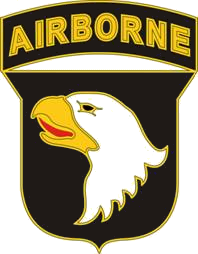

7th Cavalry Regiment Distinctive Unit Insignia
Army Presidential Unit; Citation with bronze oak leaf cluster
Joint Meritorious Unit; Commendation with bronze oak leaf cluster	Army Meritorious Unit; Commendation with two bronze oak leaf clusters	Navy Unit; Commendation
101st Airborne Division Combat Service Identification Badge

Military offices
Preceded by William B. Hickman	Deputy Commanding General for Support of the 101st Airborne Division; 2012–2014	Succeeded by Frank W. Tate
Preceded by William B. Hickman	Deputy Commanding General for Support of Regional Command East; 2012–2014	Succeeded by Frank W. Tate
Preceded by Gary J. Volesky	Chief of Army Public Affairs; 2014–2015	Succeeded by Malcolm B. Frost
Preceded by Robert B. Abrams	Senior Military Assistant to the Secretary of Defense; 2015	Succeeded by Eric M. Smith
