= General Sibley =

General Sibley may refer to:

- Frederick W. Sibley (1852–1918), U.S. Army brigadier general
- Henry Hastings Sibley (1811–1891), Union Army brigadier general and brevet major general
- Henry Hopkins Sibley (1816–1886), Confederate States Army brigadier general
