= Naomi Brooks =

American educator (1934–2020)

- Born: Naomi Lewis; April 14, 1934; Alexandria, Virginia, U.S.
- Died: May 21, 2020 (aged 86); Fort Belvoir, Virginia, U.S.
- Education: Virginia State College
- Occupations: Educator, non-profit leader
- Spouse: Leo A. Brooks Sr.
- Children: 3, including Leo A. Brooks Jr. and Vincent K. Brooks

Naomi Lewis Brooks (April 14, 1934 – May 21, 2020) was an American educator and non-profit leader, and the namesake of Naomi L. Brooks Elementary School.

== Early life and education ==
Naomi Ethel Lewis was born on April 14, 1934, in Alexandria, Virginia, the eldest of five children of James and Eunice Lewis. As a child, her family attended Oakland Baptist Church. She attended the Seminary School for Colored Children and later rode the city bus to Lyles-Crouch Elementary School and Parker-Gray High School.

In 1951, Brooks graduated second in her class from the segregated all-Black high school. While in high school, she was the starting forward on the girls' basketball team and broke the school record for the most points scored in a season and most points scored in a single game.

Brooks received a Bachelor of Science degree in Elementary Education from Virginia State College (now Virginia State University) and later earned a Master's in Elementary Education from the college.

== Career ==
In 1955, Brooks began her teaching career at Charles Houston Elementary School. She later taught at Cora Kelly Elementary School, Lynbrook Elementary School, Philadelphia Naval Yard, the U.S. Army Education Center in Alaska, and Central State University. Brooks and her family moved frequently because of her husband's military service. Throughout her adult life, Brooks held leadership roles with the Girl Scouts, United Way, and American Red Cross. When her husband was stationed in Fort Hood, Texas, Brooks helped support and nurture over 500 military spouses in the Officers' Wives club and Non-Commissioned Officers' Wives group.

When her husband, Leo A. Brooks Sr. retired as a Major general and was hired as the managing director for the City of Philadelphia, Brooks was the executive director of the Coles House organization serving young women around the world.

== Personal life and family ==
In 1955, Brooks married her college sweetheart, Leo A. Brooks. Together, they had three children, including Leo A. Brooks Jr., Vincent K. Brooks, and Marquita Brooks.

She was a member of the International Literacy Association, American Association of University Women, the Kappa Delta Pi sorority, and a lifelong member of the Alfred Street Baptist Church.

== Death and legacy ==
Brooks died on May 21, 2020, at the age of 86 at Fort Belvoir Community Hospital.

=== Honors ===
In 2019, shortly before her death, Brooks was selected to receive the "Dean's Cross" award from the Virginia Theological Seminary, a recognition of "outstanding leaders who embody their baptismal vows to strive for justice and peace among all people."

Naomi L. Brooks Elementary School in Alexandria City Public Schools is named after Brooks. The school was formerly named "Matthew Maury Elementary School" but was renamed in 2021.
