= Margaret W. Burcham =

Brigadier-general in the U.S. Army Corps of Engineers

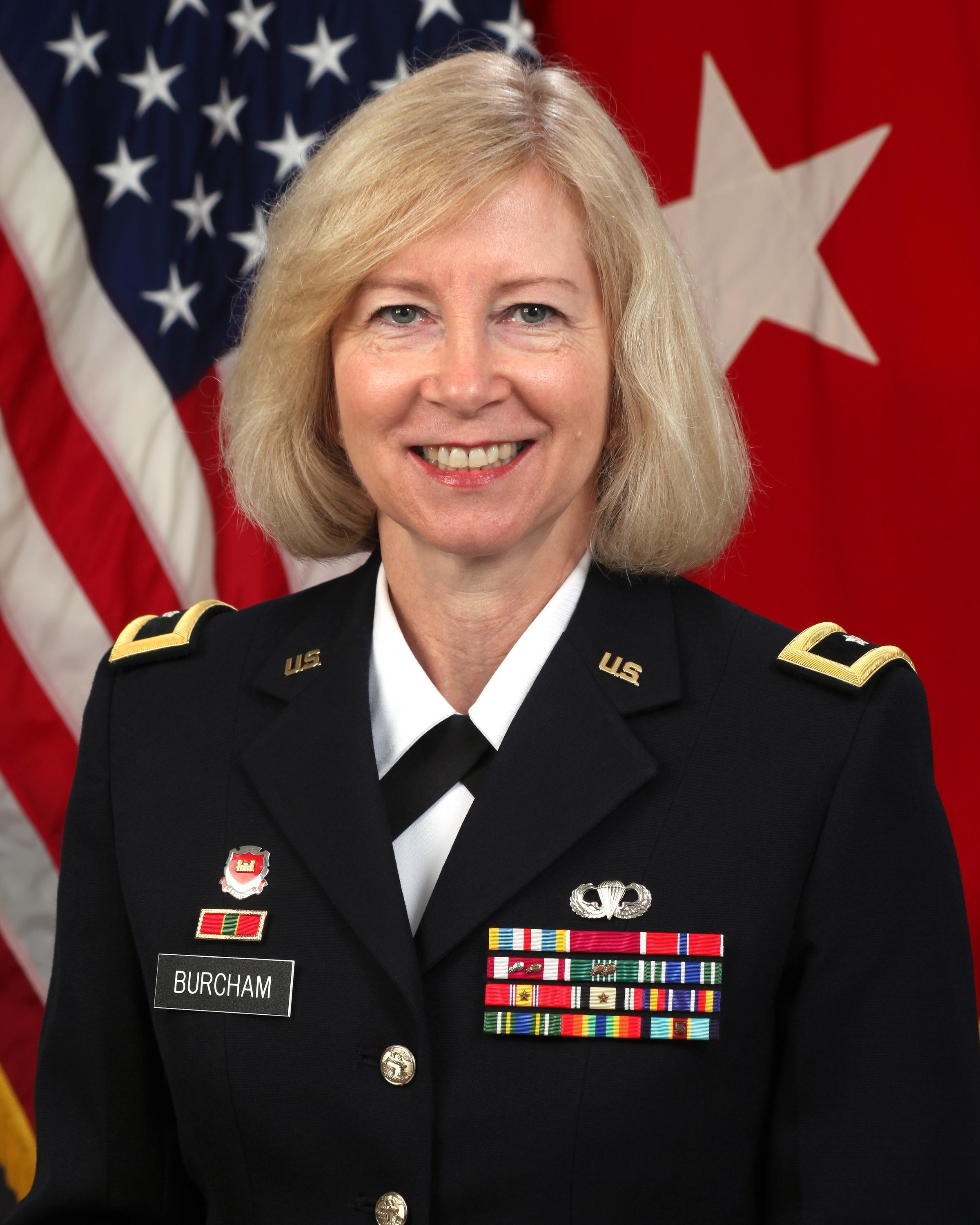
- Born: Margaret E. Williams
- Military career
- Allegiance: United States
- Branch: United States Army
- Service years: 1978–2016
- Rank: Brigadier General
- Commands: Director of Manpower and Personnel for the Joint Chiefs of Staff (2015–2016)
- Conflicts: Iraq War
- Awards: Defense Superior Service Medal; Legion of Merit; Bronze Star Medal

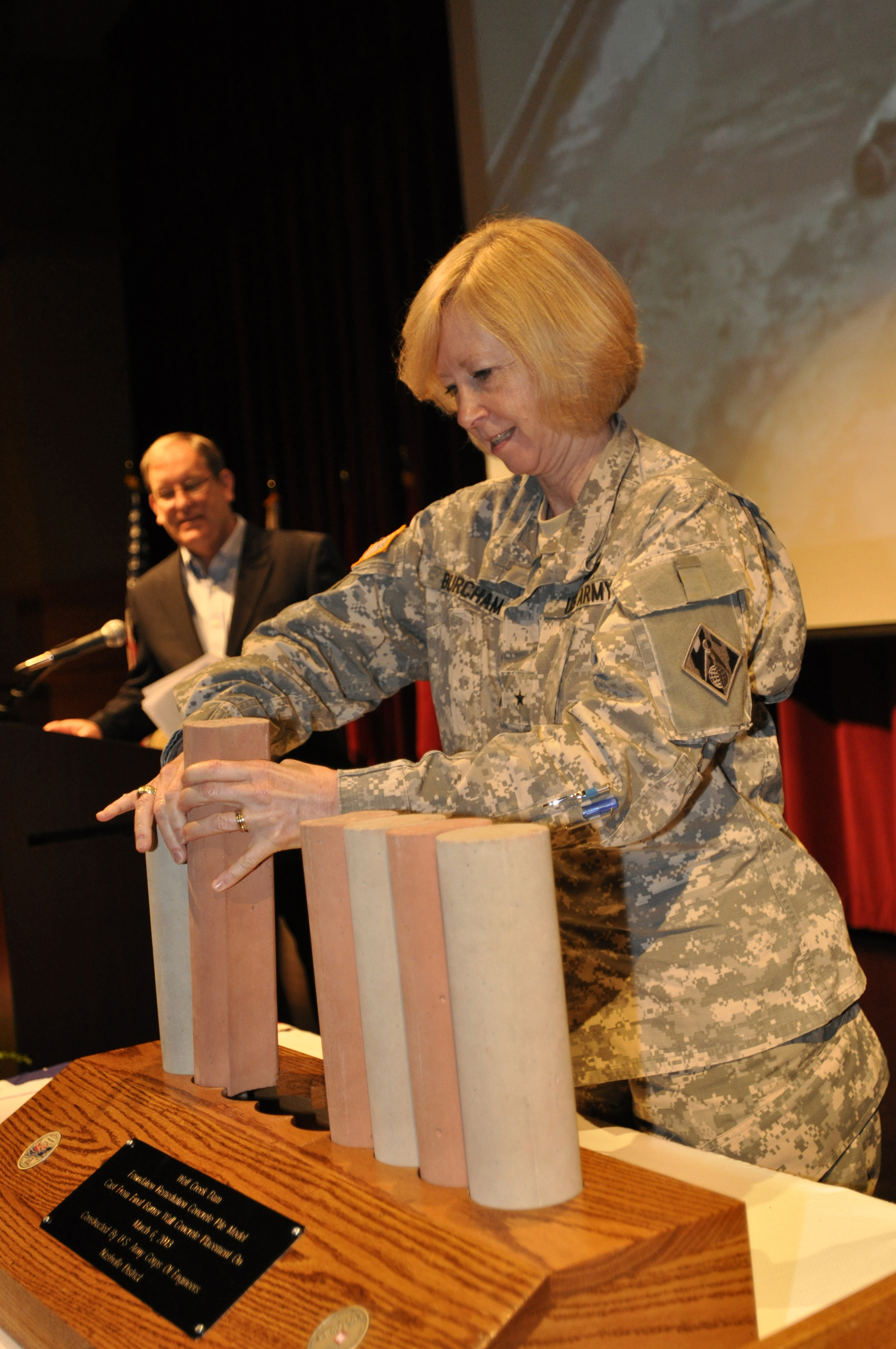
Margaret Burcham

Margaret Williams Burcham is a retired brigadier general of the United States Army. She was the first female brigadier general in the United States Army Corps of Engineers.

== Military career ==
Burcham attended the United States Military Academy at West Point where she studied civil engineering and was commissioned into the United States Army Corps of Engineers (USACE) in 1982. She holds a master's degree in computer science from Kansas State University and an M.S. degree in national security strategy from the Industrial College of the Armed Forces. Burcham attended the Engineer Officer Basic and Advanced Courses and also studied at the Combined Arms Services Staff School, the United States Army Command and General Staff College and the Senior Service College.

Burcham has been chief of the Joint Capabilities Division of the Resources, Assessments and Force Management Directorate at the Pentagon and commander of the USACE North Engineer District in Iraq and the Europe Engineer District. She was appointed commander of the USACE Great Lakes and Ohio River Division in September 2011, the first woman to command a USACE division. In this role, Burcham commanded 4,800 personnel in seven engineering districts covering 17 states and including the waters within the Great Lakes and Ohio River basins. Her annual budget was $2 billion and the division's responsibilities included the maintenance of navigational aids, flood defense projects, water conservation schemes, hydro-electric power and environmental restoration projects of an asset value of over $80 billion. She was promoted to brigadier general on January 27, 2012 at the USACE headquarters in Washington and became the first female general of the USACE. She was appointed to the Mississippi River Commission on May 28, 2013 by President Barack Obama.

Burcham was appointed Director of Manpower and Personnel for the Joint Chiefs of Staff by June 2015. She retired from active duty in August 2016.

== Personal ==
Burcham is married to Jay M. Burcham, currently Chief of Staff of Department of Defense Dependents Schools, and previously in senior DOD Civilian roles after a career as U.S. Army commissioned officer in the Armor Branch. She has a daughter and a son from a previous marriage to William C. "Bill" Tubesing.
