= Francis K. Brooks =

American politician (born 1943)

Member of the Vermont Senate from the Washington district
- In office January 2017 – January 2019 Serving with Anthony Pollina, Ann Cummings
- Preceded by: William T. Doyle
- Succeeded by: Andrew Perchlik

Sergeant at Arms of the Vermont State House
- In office February 2007 – February 2015
- Preceded by: Kermit Spaulding
- Succeeded by: Janet Miller

Member of the Vermont House of Representatives from the Washington 5-1 district
- In office January 1983 – February 2007
- Preceded by: John C. Corskie
- Succeeded by: Jon Anderson

Personal details
- Born: May 24, 1943 (age 83) Washington, DC, U.S.
- Party: Democratic
- Spouse: Eunice W. Williams
- Children: 2
- Education: Norwich University; Clarkson University
- Profession: Teacher

Francis K. Brooks (born May 24, 1943) is a Vermont educator and politician who served in the Vermont House of Representatives from 1983 to 2007. Brooks was a member of the Vermont Senate from 2017 to 2019.

== Biography ==
Francis K. Brooks was born in Washington, DC on May 24, 1943. He attended the schools of Alexandria, Virginia, and graduated from Parker-Gray High School. In 1967, Brooks graduated from Norwich University with a Bachelor of Science degree. In 1974 he received a Master of Science degree from Clarkson University.

Brooks resides in Montpelier; he became a high school science teacher, and taught chemistry and physics at Montpelier High School before his retirement.

In 1982, Brooks ran successfully for the Vermont House of Representatives as a Democrat. He was reelected every two years through 2006, and served from January 1983 until resigning in February 2007. During his House career, Brooks served as the Majority Leader from 1987 to 1993 and chairman of the General, Housing, and Military Affairs Committee from 2005 to 2007.

From February 2007 to February 2015, Brooks was the Sergeant at Arms of the Vermont State House, the building administrator and manager of its full-time staff. In February 2015, Brooks lost the legislative election for reappointment to the post, apparently in response to concerns over how the State House staff handled protesters who interrupted the January inauguration of Governor Peter Shumlin.

In 2016, Brooks was a candidate for one of three seats representing Washington County in the Vermont Senate. In the August primary, incumbents Anthony Pollina and Ann Cummings were renominated by the Democratic Party. Brooks won the third nomination by defeating fourth-place finisher Ashley Hill; Brooks won by one vote, 3,709 to 3,708, a result which was confirmed by a recount.

In the November general election, Pollina and Cummings were reelected. Brooks won the third seat by defeating Republican William T. Doyle, the longest-serving legislator and longest-serving state senator in Vermont history.

Brooks served on the Senate Committee on Agriculture and Committee on Institutions. In addition, he serves on the Barre Granite and Ethnic Culture Museum Steering Committee and the Human Services and Educational Facilities Grant Advisory Committee.

In May 2018, Brooks announced that he would not run for reelection, and he retired at the expiration of his term in January 2019. In the 2018 election, Cummings and Pollina were reelected and the third seat was won by Democrat Andrew Perchlik.

== Family ==
He is married to the former Eunice W. Williams, and they have one son and one daughter.

Brooks is the brother of retired Major General Leo A. Brooks, Sr., and the uncle of retired General Vincent K. Brooks and retired Brigadier General Leo A. Brooks, Jr.

== Personal ==
Brooks is active in Montpelier's Baptist Church, and has served for many years as both a lay preacher and vocal soloist.

== Sources ==
=== Internet ===
- Secretary of the Vermont Senate. "Biography, Senator Francis K. Brooks". Vermont General Assembly. Montpelier, VT: Vermont Senate.
- "House Concurrent Resolution 61" (PDF). Vermont General Assembly. Montpelier, VT: Vermont House of Representatives. 2015. Archived from the original (PDF) on January 27, 2017.

=== News ===
- Heintz, Paul (November 9, 2016). "Doyle Defeated as Democrats Gain Seats in the Vermont Senate". Seven Days. Burlington, VT.
- Hewitt, Elizabeth (May 31, 2018). "Francis Brooks to retire from state Senate". VT Digger. Montpelier, VT.
- Hirschfeld, Peter (February 15, 2015). "Farewell, Francis: Lawmakers Elect A New Sergeant-At-Arms". Vermont Public Radio. Colchester, VT.
- Johnson, Mark (August 27, 2016). "Brooks beats out Hill in recount of Washington County Senate race". VT Digger. Montpelier, VT.
- Walters, John (November 14, 2018). "Supermajority Rules: The Challenges of Legislative Dominance". Vermont Seven Days. Burlington, VT.

=== Books ===
- Hawkins, Walter L. (2009-02-13). Black American Military Leaders: A Biographical Dictionary. Jefferson, NC: McFarland & Company. pp. 59–60. ISBN 978-0-7864-4462-5 – via Google Books.
