= Lori L. Robinson =

80th Commandant of Cadets of the United States Military Academy

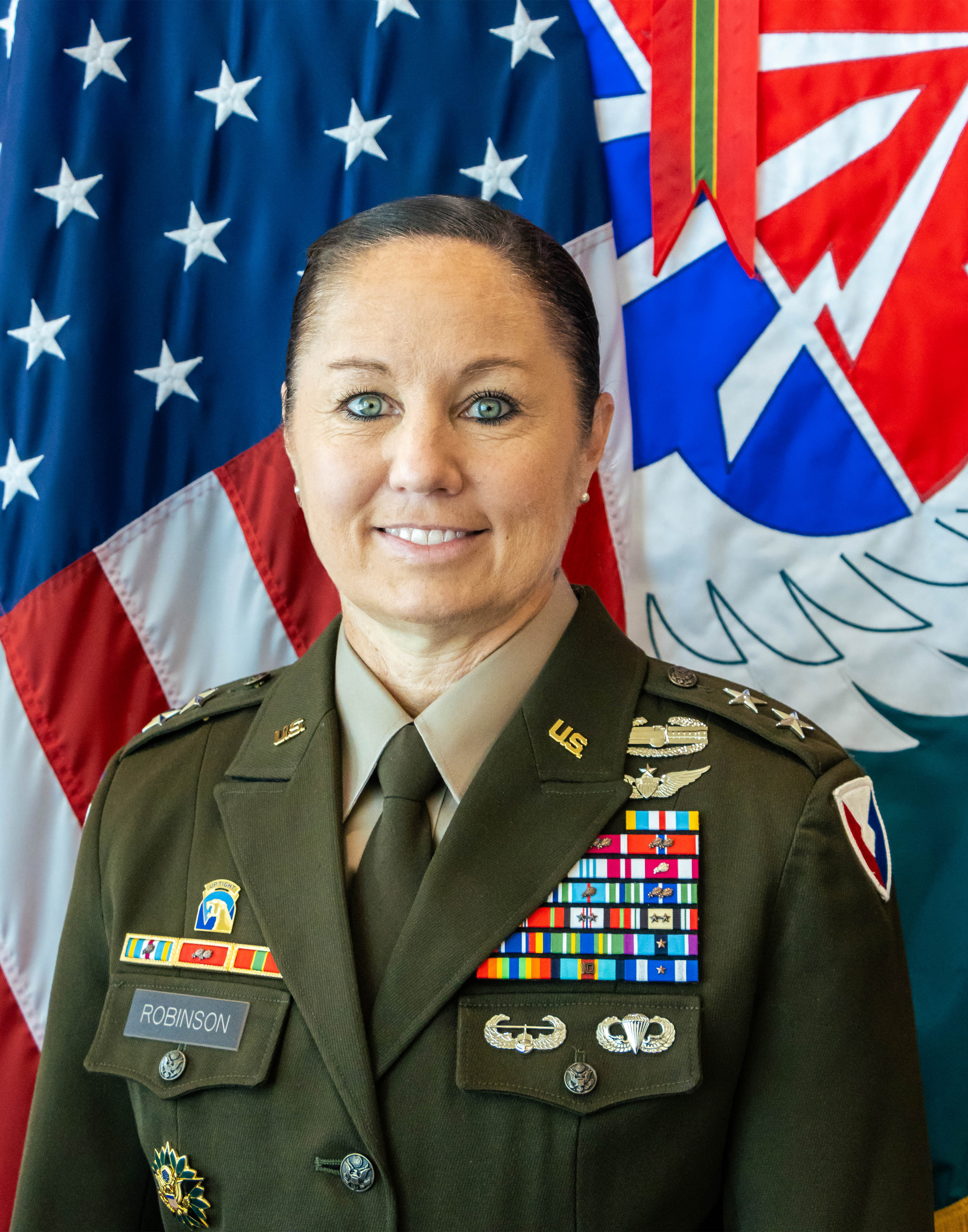

Commandant of Cadets of the United States Military Academy
- In office June 20, 2023 – June 14, 2024
- Preceded by: Mark Quander
- Succeeded by: R.J. Garcia

Personal details
- Born: 1971/1972 (age 54–55)
- Education: U.S. Military Academy (BS); John Jay College of Criminal Justice (MPA); United States Army War College (MS)
- Awards: Bronze Star

Military service
- Branch/service: United States Army
- Years of service: 1994–2026
- Rank: Major general

Lori L. Robinson (born 1971/1972) is a retired United States Army major general who last served as the commander of the U.S. Army Aviation and Missile Command until July 2026.

== Early life and education ==
A native of Paterson, New Jersey, she attended Paterson Catholic High School, where she earned varsity letters in basketball, softball and volleyball, and was inducted into the National Honor Society. She had been accepted by Purdue University, but aspired to earn an appointment to West Point.

== Military career ==
Robinson graduated from the West Point in 1994 with a Bachelor of Science degree and was commissioned as an aviation officer. After graduation, she classified as a CH-47 Chinook helicopter pilot. Robinson has served in a variety of aviation assignments both stateside and overseas to include four combat deployments to Iraq and Afghanistan. She has held both command and staff positions from company through brigade task force level.

=== Career at West Point ===
Previously, Robinson served at West Point from 2003 to 2005 in the department of military instruction. On June 20, 2023, Robinson succeeded Mark Quander as the Commandant.

In February 2024, Robinson was assigned as commanding general of the United States Army Aviation and Missile Command. She relieved command on 31 July 2026 and retired from the Army after 32 years of active-duty service.

== Personal life ==
Robinson is married to COL(R) Thomas J. Robinson Jr. who served as a U.S. Army Field Artillery officer for 26 years.

== Citations ==
Military offices
Preceded by Mark Quander	Commandant of Cadets of the United States Military Academy; 2023–2024	Succeeded by R.J. Garcia
Preceded by Thomas W. O'Connor Jr.	Commanding General of the United States Army Aviation and Missile Command; 2024–2026	Incumbent
