= Fred A. Gorden =

United States Army general

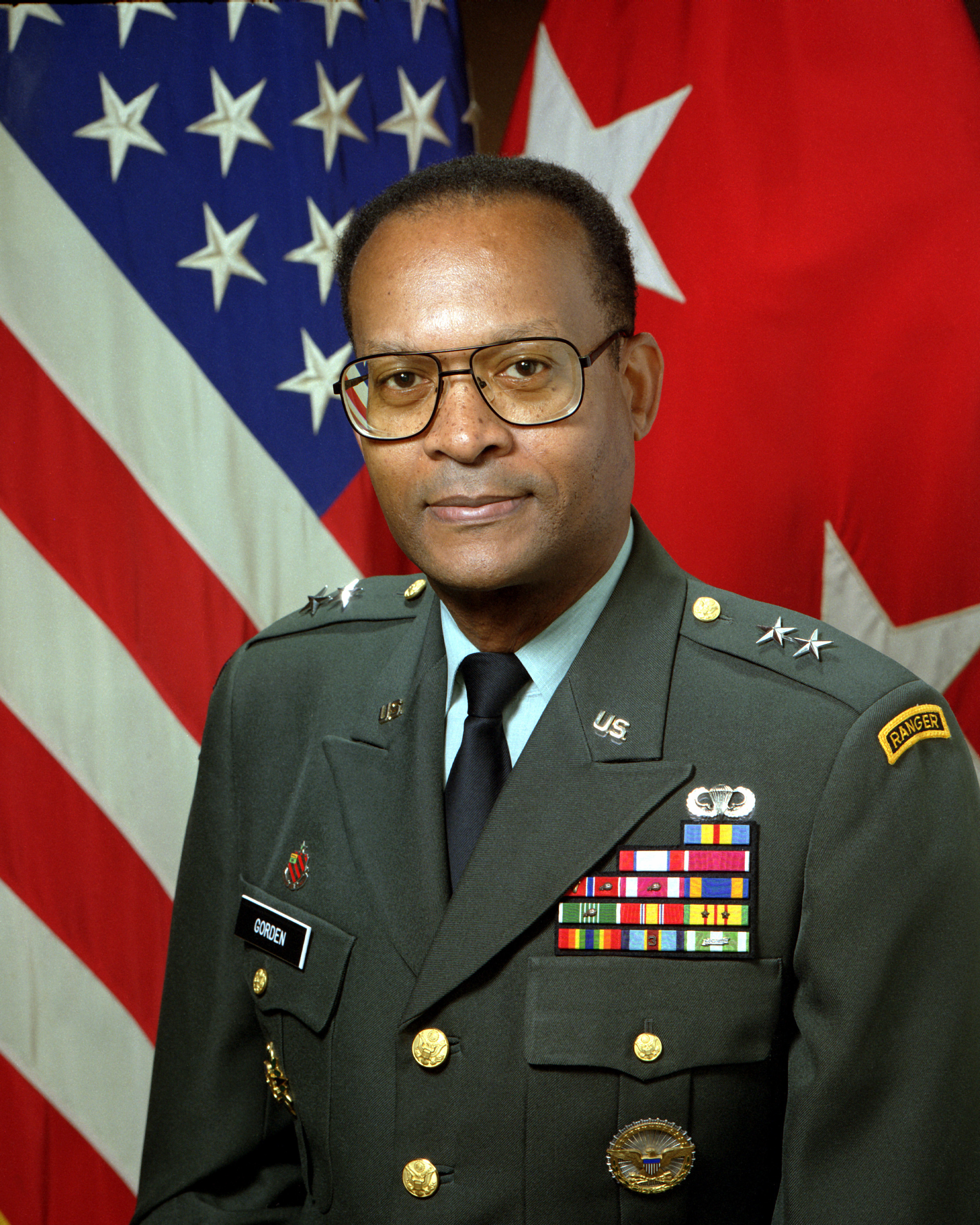
- Born: February 22, 1940 (age 86); Anniston, Alabama U.S.
- Died: 25 Mar 2025; Howard City, Maryland
- Military career
- Allegiance: United States
- Branch: United States Army
- Service years: 1962–1996
- Rank: Major General
- Commands: Army Military District of Washington; 25th Infantry Division; Commandant of Cadets; Division Artillery, 7th Infantry Division
- Conflicts: Vietnam War

Fred Augustus Gorden (born February 22, 1940) is a retired major general in the United States Army. He graduated from the United States Military Academy in 1962 and was the first African-American to serve as Commandant of Cadets. Gorden also earned an M.A. degree in Spanish language and literature from Middlebury College in 1969.

Promoted to colonel on August 7, 1980, Gorden served as commander of Division Artillery, 7th Infantry Division at Fort Ord. Promoted to brigadier general on October 1, 1985, he served as assistant commander of the 7th Infantry Division and then as the 61st Commandant of Cadets at the Military Academy. As a major general, Gorden assumed command of the 25th Infantry Division at Schofield Barracks in January 1990. He served as commander of the Army Military District of Washington from May 20, 1993, to August 29, 1995. His final assignment was as chief of public affairs for the Department of the Army. Gorden retired from active duty effective October 1, 1996.

His honors include the Legion of Merit, two Army Distinguished Service Medals and the Defense Distinguished Service Medal.
