= Peter J. Boylan =

United States Army general (1936–2023)

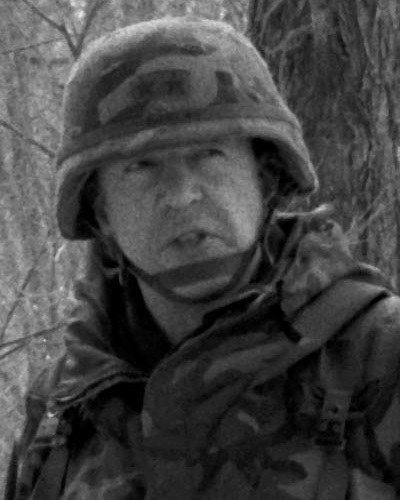
- Boylan in 1988
- Born: May 18, 1936; Portage, Wisconsin, U.S.
- Died: November 12, 2023 (aged 87); Milledgeville, Georgia, U.S.
- Burial place: West Point Cemetery, West Point, New York, U.S.
- Military career
- Allegiance: United States
- Branch: United States Army
- Service years: 1961–1992
- Rank: Major General
- Commands: 10th Mountain Division; 1st Brigade, 82nd Airborne Division; 3rd Battalion, 325th Infantry
- Conflicts: Vietnam War; United States invasion of Grenada
- Awards: Distinguished Service Medal; Silver Star; Legion of Merit; Bronze Star Medal (3); Purple Heart; Air Medal

Peter James Boylan Jr. (May 18, 1936 – November 12, 2023) was a major general of the United States Army.

== Early life and education ==
Boylan was born in Portage, Wisconsin, on May 18, 1936. He was a 1954 graduate of Portage High School and was inducted into their Hall of Fame. Boylan then studied at the University of Wisconsin for a few semesters. He went on to earn a B.S. degree in military science from the United States Military Academy. Boylan graduated from the University of Michigan with an M.S. degree in 1969 and an M.S.E. degree in 1970, having studied aerospace engineering and systems engineering. He also studied at the Army Command and General Staff College and the Naval War College. Boylan later received an honorary Doctor of Letters from Flagler College.

== Military career ==
Boylan enlisted in the U.S. Army on October 10, 1956, before being appointed to the U.S. Military Academy the following year, graduating in 1961. He then went on to serve two tours of duty in the Vietnam War.

In 1983, Boylan took part in the Invasion of Grenada with the 82nd Airborne Division. He later served in the Office of the Joint Chief of Staff at The Pentagon, Deputy Inspector General of the Army and commander of the 10th Mountain Division. Boylan would also return to the United States Military Academy as assistant professor of Mechanical Engineering from 1969 to 1972 and Commandant of Cadets from 1984 to 1987. He was on the board of trustees for the United States Military Academy. He retired from the army in 1992 and was appointed president of Georgia Military College later that year.

Awards Boylan received during his time in the army include the Distinguished Service Medal, the Silver Star, the Legion of Merit, the Bronze Star Medal with two oak leaf clusters and two Valor devices, the Purple Heart, the Air Medal, the Combat Infantryman Badge, the Ranger tab and the Master Parachutist Badge.

== Personal life ==
Boylan married Kathleen E. "Kathy" Costa on July 1, 1961. They had two sons and three daughters. Both sons, one daughter and a grandson graduated from West Point. Their son Colonel Gregory L. Boylan has made a military career teaching at West Point, following in footsteps of his uncle Brigadier General John J. Costa (May 7, 1925 – August 6, 2013) who retired on May 31, 1989, as the last veteran of World War II on active duty in the U.S. Armed Forces.

Boylan was a cantor at his local Roman Catholic church, the Sacred Heart of Jesus Catholic Church.

Boylan resided in Milledgeville, Georgia, with his wife. He died there on November 12, 2023, at the age of 87.
