= Sean Michael Callahan =

American soccer player (born 1978)

Sean-Michael Callahan
Personal information
- Date of birth: April 17, 1978 (age 48)
- Place of birth: Sacramento, California, U.S.
- Height: 5 ft 8 in (1.73 m)
- Position: Midfielder

Youth career
- 1996–1999: Santa Clara Broncos

Senior career*
Years	Team	Apps	(Gls)
2000	Sacramento Knights (indoor)		
2001	Atlanta Silverbacks	24	(7)
2002	Rochester Rhinos	0	(0)
2002	→ Hampton Roads Mariners (loan)	15	(3)
2003–2004	Seattle Sounders	26	(5)
2006	Sacramento Knights		
- * Club domestic league appearances and goals

Sean Michael Callahan is an American retired professional soccer player who played professionally in the USL A-League and World Indoor Soccer League.

In 1996, Callahan graduated from Jesuit High School. He attended Santa Clara University, playing on the men's soccer team from 1996 to 1999, participating in 1998 & 1999 Final Fours, reaching the National Championship vs. Indiana in 1999. He led the nation in assists his senior season. Callahan turned professional in 2000 with the Sacramento Knights of the World Indoor Soccer League. He moved outdoors in 2001 with the Atlanta Silverbacks of the USL A-League. In 2002, Callahan moved to the Rochester Rhinos, but went on loan to the Hampton Roads Mariners for most of the season. On April 3, 2003, Callahan signed with the Seattle Sounders. He retired from professional soccer after the 2004 season, but spent one season with the fourth division Sacramento Knights of the amateur National Premier Soccer League in 2006. The Knights won the league championship that season. champs. Sean-Michael is married with five children and is now a procurement/finance executive.
