= Tanner Dodson =

American baseball player (born 1997)

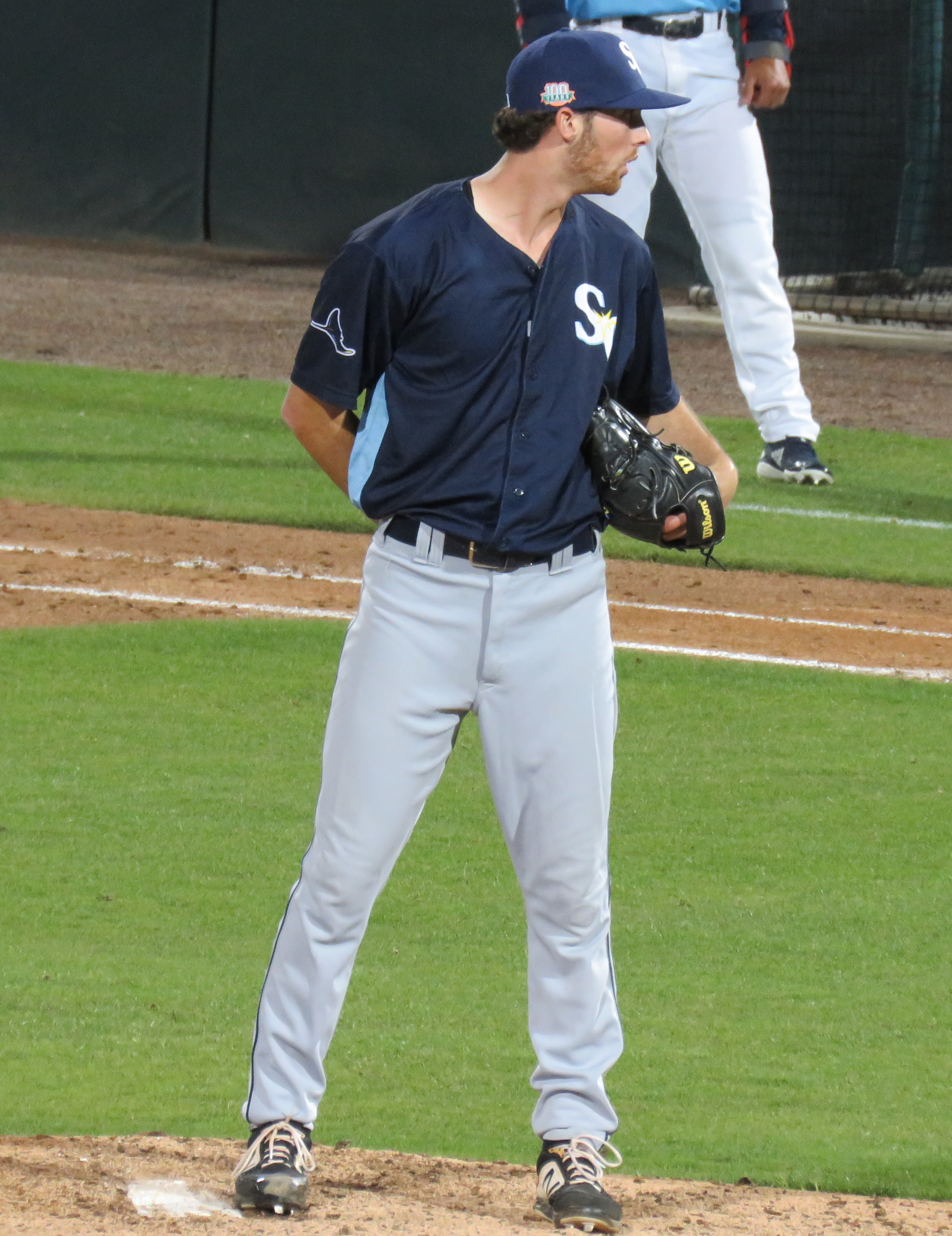
- Dodson in 2019 with the Charlotte Stone Crabs

Free agent
- Pitcher
- Born: May 9, 1997 (age 29); Sacramento, California, U.S.
- Bats: Switch Throws: Right
- Stats at Baseball Reference

Tanner Dodson (born May 9, 1997) is an American professional baseball pitcher who is a free agent.

== Amateur career ==
Dodson attended Jesuit High School in Carmichael, California. In 2015, as a senior, he batted .430 along with pitching to a 2.10 ERA. He was selected by the New York Mets in the 31st round of the 2015 Major League Baseball draft, but he did not sign and instead chose to attend the University of California at Berkeley to play college baseball for the California Golden Bears.

As a freshman at California in 2016, Dodson pitched 61 2/3 innings (19 games with nine being starts) in which he compiled a 3.36 ERA. In 2017, as a sophomore, he began playing center field along with pitching. That season, he batted .297 with three home runs and 26 RBIs in 185 at-bats while pitching to a 2-6 record and 5.37 ERA in 19 games (seven starts). After the season, he played collegiate summer baseball for the Wareham Gatemen in the Cape Cod Baseball League, where he was named a league all-star and batted .365 in 29 games, earning him the league batting title. Prior to the 2018 season, Dodson was named a preseason All-American by Baseball America. In 54 games, he batted .320 with one home run and 27 RBIs while along with posting a 2-1 record and 2.48 ERA in 40 relief innings pitched. After the season, he was named to the All-Pac-12 team and the All-Defensive team.

== Professional career ==
=== Tampa Bay Rays ===
Dodson was selected 71st overall by the Tampa Bay Rays in the 2018 Major League Baseball draft as a two-way player. He signed for $775,000 and made his professional debut with the Hudson Valley Renegades of the Low-A New York–Penn League. He spent the whole season there, batting .273 with two home runs and 19 RBI in 49 games along with pitching to a 1-0 record and a 1.44 ERA in 25 relief innings pitched. Dodson spent 2019 with the Charlotte Stone Crabs of the High-A Florida State League but missed the last three months of the season after undergoing Tommy John surgery. Over 15 games, he batted .250, and over 17 innings pitched, he compiled a 5.29 ERA. Dodson did not play a minor league game in 2020 due to cancellation of the minor league season because of the COVID-19 pandemic.

To begin the 2021 season, Dodson transitioned to pitching full time, was assigned to the Bowling Green Hot Rods of the High-A East, and then was promoted to the Montgomery Biscuits of the Double-A South on August 1. Over 37 appearances for the year, Dodson went 5-2 with a 3.20 ERA and 64 strikeouts over 56 1/3 innings.

=== Los Angeles Dodgers ===
On March 18, 2022, Dodson was traded to the Los Angeles Dodgers in exchange for Luke Raley. He was assigned to the Tulsa Drillers of the Double-A Texas League for the 2022 season, where he was 4–0 with a 8.39 ERA and 29 strikeouts over 29 appearances. Dodson was selected to play in the Arizona Fall League for the Glendale Desert Dogs after the season. For the 2023 season, he returned to Tulsa and was promoted to the Triple-A Oklahoma City Dodgers later in the year. Between the two affiliates, Dodson pitched in 50 games with a 5–7 record and 4.88 ERA with 51 strikeouts across 66 1/3 innings pitched.

Dodson returned to Triple-A Oklahoma City for the 2024 season, where he was 3–3 with a 3.32 ERA and 58 strikeouts in 62 1/3 innings pitched over 41 games. Dodson elected free agency following the season on November 4, 2024.

=== Athletics ===
On November 13, 2024, Dodson signed a minor league contract with the Athletics. He made 34 appearances (one start) for the Triple-A Las Vegas Aviators in 2025, registering a 2-2 record and 7.90 ERA with 32 strikeouts over 41 innings of work. Dodson elected free agency following the season on November 6, 2025.
