= Jesuit High School (Carmichael) =

Location
- 1200 Jacob Lane; Carmichael, California 95608; United States; 38°35′12″N 121°21′4″W

Information
- Type: Private high school
- Motto: Men for Others
- Religious affiliation: Society of Jesus
- Established: 1963; 63 years ago
- Principal: Michael Wood
- Faculty: 69.3 (2021–22)(FTE)
- Grades: 9–12
- Gender: All-Boys
- Enrollment: 976 (2021–22)
- Student to teacher ratio: 14.1 (2021–22)
- Campus: Small city
- Campus size: ~50 acres (0.20 km^{2})
- Colors: Red and Gold
- Athletics conference: Delta River League
Sports
Varsity Sports
- Baseball Basketball Football Volleyball Soccer; Lacrosse Rugby eSports	Golf; Cross Country Swimming Tennis; Track & Field Wrestling; Water Polo
- Team name: Marauders
- Rivals: Christian Brothers; Rio Americano; Davis
- Accreditation: WASC
- Newspaper: The Plank
- Yearbook: The Cutlass
- Tuition: $17,865 USD (2023-24)
- Website: jesuithighschool.org
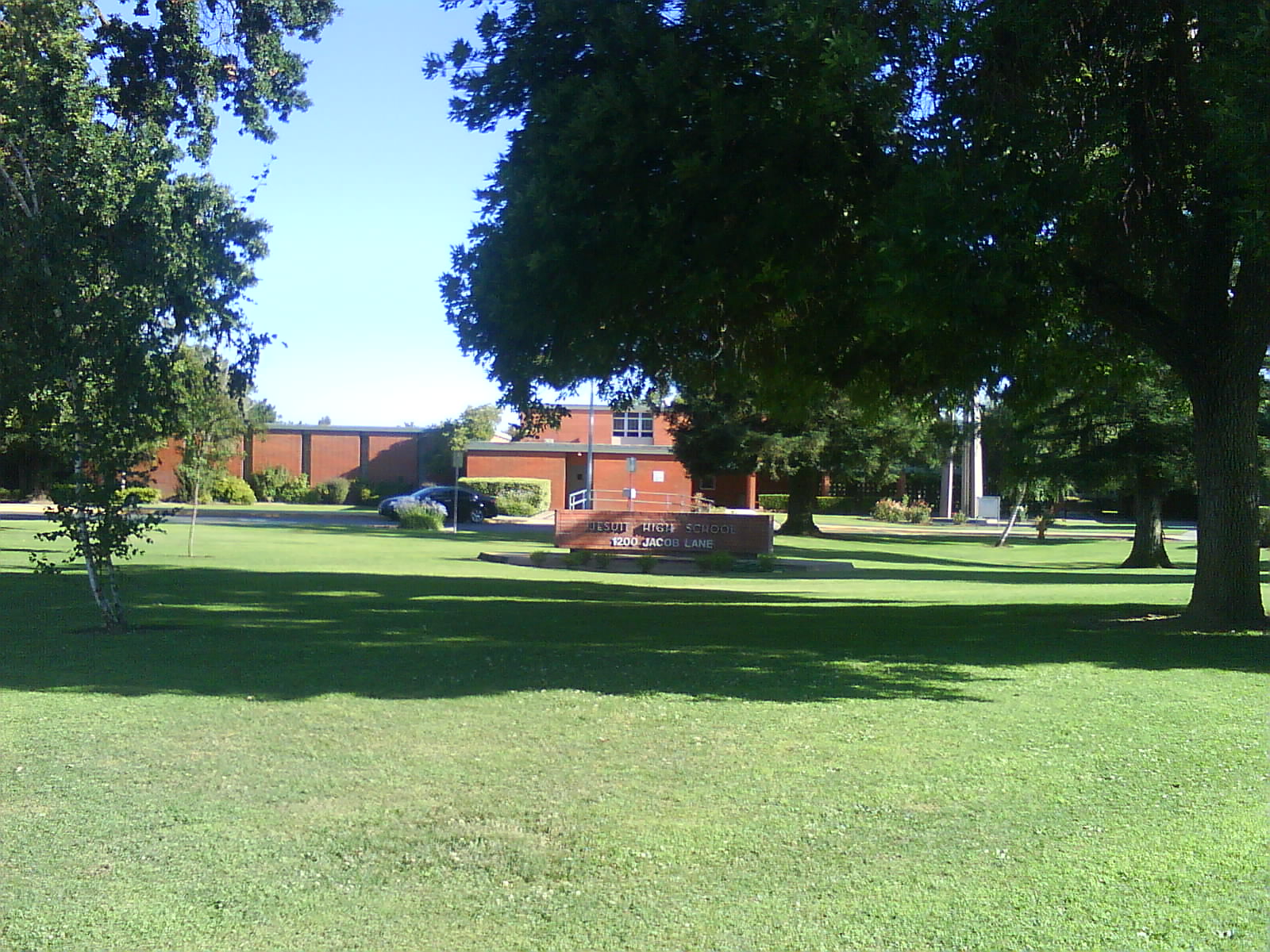
- Front on Jacob Lane

Jesuit High School is a private Catholic college-preparatory high school run by the USA West Province of the Society of Jesus in the Sacramento suburb of Carmichael, California. It was founded in 1963 and enrolls about 1,000 young men from throughout greater Sacramento Valley in California.

Jesuit is accredited by the Western Association of Schools and Colleges and the Western Catholic Educational Association (WCEA). Additionally, Jesuit is a member of the College Board, the Jesuit Schools Network, and the National Association for College Admission Counseling.

In 2016, the Washington Post named Jesuit High one of America's most challenging private schools.

== Admissions ==
Admission is selective, through application in the 8th grade, a written examination which takes place on the school's campus, approval by the admissions office, and an interview by a faculty member of the school. Transfer applications are accepted for the 10th and 11th grades.

== History ==
Bishop Joseph Thomas McGucken invited the Jesuits to develop the high school, and in January 1961 they purchased 21 acres, then part of the Horst Ranch, for the new campus. The school opened in the fall of 1963, and over the next several years acquired additional land for athletic facilities, faculty residences, and a gymnasium-theater complex.

On October 5, 2025, Jesuit High School announced it would begin accepting girls in a "co-divisional" model to the historically all-boys campus.

== Campus life ==
Each building on campus is named after one of the eight North American Martyrs, who are the school's patron saints. The largest building – the Jesuit Residence and Main Office – is named Brébeuf Hall.

== Activities ==
Clubs and co-curricular activities offered by Jesuit include: The Plank newspaper, The Cutlass yearbook, Jazz Band, Speech and Debate, Marching Band, Robotics, Drama (Theater), Future Business Leaders of America, Concert Bands, Latinos Unidos, Mock trial, Mathletes, Drumline, and Young Democrats and Republicans.

The Jesuit High School International Robotics Team competes at the collegiate level, and is one of only two high school robotics teams entered in underwater robotics. In June 2011 the team won the Marine Advanced Technology Education Center (MATE) ROV competition which was held at the Neutral Buoyancy Lab in Houston, Texas. The team of about 20 students from all four years in the school is structured as a company with subgroups working together to design, build, test, and deliver one successful product. In 2012 the team placed third and in 2013 first at the MATE competition in Tacoma, WA, repeating again in 2014 with a first place in Alpena, MI. In 2015, the team captured its third international MATE ROV competition in St. John's, Newfoundland, Canada. In addition to being the overall champions, the team won awards in Design Excellence, Best Technical Documentation, Best Sales Presentation, and Best Product Demonstration. The team is currently on a three-year win streak, having taken first place in 2021, 2022, and 2023.

== Sports ==
Jesuit High School offers 15 varsity sports, most of which also feature JV and freshman squads.

Jesuit's rugby program won nine national championships through 2019, along with multiple state championships. After battling illness and weather delays at the 2019 national championships in Salt Lake City, Jesuit eked out a narrow victory against longtime cross-country rival Gonzaga College High School, to advance to the championship match. In an unprecedented act, Gonzaga formed a tunnel to honor their rival as Jesuit took the field. In that game, Jesuit won their ninth championship over near home town Herriman High School, holding Herriman a mere foot from the goal line as time expired. Jesuit High School has also produced many rugby players who have gone on to represent the United States National Team at the U-16, U-17, U-19, Collegiate, and Men's levels, detailed below in notable alumni.

The cross country team has won nine state championships and qualified for Nike Cross Nationals in 2005 and 2006, placing 7th and 4th respectively.

Jesuit's eSports Super Smash Bros. team has won two state championships in 2021 and 2022, including the first CIF-sanctioned title in May 2021 by beating the previously undefeated and top-ranked team Franklin High School (Los Angeles) at the Super Smash Bros. Ultimate California State Championship.

The Marauders' chief rival is Christian Brothers High School (Sacramento, California). This rivalry culminates in the Holy Bowl - an annual, Jesuit-Christian Brothers American football game generally held in Charles C. Hughes Stadium. The current standings of the bowl game is 33–18–2 in favor of Jesuit.

== Notable alumni ==
- Leo A. Brooks, Jr. (Ret.), U.S. Army Commandant, U.S. Military Academy, West Point
- Vincent K. Brooks, U.S. Army, commander U.S. Army Pacific, commander U.S. Third Army, deputy director of operations during Iraq War
- Ryan T. Holte, federal judge, United States Court of Federal Claims
- Kevin Keller, contemporary classical composer and pianist
- Chris Sullivan, actor on TV shows, This is Us and Stranger Things

=== Athletes ===
Baseball

- Lars Anderson, MLB first baseman for the Boston Red Sox
- Tanner Dodson, pitcher in the Los Angeles Dodgers organization
- Zach Green, MLB first baseman for the San Francisco Giants
- Rhys Hoskins, MLB first baseman for the Philadelphia Phillies, Milwaukee Brewers, and Cleveland Guardians
- J. P. Howell, pitcher for the Kansas City Royals, Tampa Bay Rays, Los Angeles Dodgers, and Toronto Blue Jays
- Jerry Nielsen, MLB pitcher for the New York Yankees and California Angels
- Mike Rose, MLB catcher for the Oakland Athletics, Los Angeles Dodgers, and St. Louis Cardinals
- Nick Sogard, MLB infielder for the Boston Red Sox
- Andrew Susac, catcher for the San Francisco Giants, Milwaukee Brewers, Baltimore Orioles, and Pittsburgh Pirates
- Daniel Susac, MLB catcher for the San Francisco Giants

Basketball

- Isaac Fontaine, NBA basketball player with the Memphis Grizzlies
- Festus Ezeli, NBA player for the Golden State Warriors
- Andrej Stojaković, college basketball player for the Illinois Fighting Illini, son of NBA player Peja Stojakovic

Football

- Matt Bouza, nine-year NFL wide receiver for the San Francisco 49ers and the Indianapolis Colts
- Nigel Burton, head coach of the Portland State Vikings
- Giovanni Carmazzi, quarterback and third-round draft pick by the San Francisco 49ers
- John Huddleston, linebacker for the Oakland Raiders
- Keleki Latu, tight end and undrafted free agent for the Buffalo Bills
- Laiatu Latu, edge rusher for the UCLA Bruins and Indianapolis Colts 1st-round draft pick (2024.)
- Etu Molden, wide receiver/defensive back for the Chicago Rush of the Arena Football League
- Ken O'Brien, quarterback for the New York Jets and Philadelphia Eagles
- J. T. O'Sullivan, NFL quarterback
- Isaiah Frey, Frey is now the defensive coordinator for Jesuit's football team NFL cornerback
- Ferric Collons, NFL defensive end

Golf

- Scott Gordon, PGA Tour golfer

Olympians

- Jeffrey Float, Olympic medalist in swimming
- Michael Stember, Olympic middle-distance runner

Rugby

- Christian Dyer, professional rugby player, USA international in both Rugby 7s and Rugby 15s
- Eric Fry, professional rugby player, USA international in 2011 Rugby World Cup
- Colin Hawley, professional rugby player, USA international in 2011 Rugby World Cup
- Kirk Khasigian, professional rugby player, USA international in 2003 Rugby World Cup
- Kort Schubert, professional rugby player, USA international in 2007 Rugby World Cup
- Blaine Scully, professional rugby player, USA international in 2011 Rugby World Cup
- Louis Stanfill, professional rugby player, USA international in 2007 Rugby World Cup and 2011 Rugby World Cup
- Nicklas Boyer, professional rugby player, USA international in both Rugby 7s and Rugby 15s

Soccer

- Adam Jahn, Major League Soccer player
- Sean Michael Callahan, Major League Soccer player
- Amobi Okugo, Major League Soccer player
- Cameron Iwasa, USL Championship, Major League Soccer player
- Niko Hansen, Major League Soccer player

Tennis

- Sam Warburg, professional tennis player

Track and field

- Eric Mastalir, former national record holder, 3200 meters

== See also ==
- List of Jesuit secondary schools in the United States
