= Great Lakes and Ohio River Division =

One of the eight permanent divisions of the U.S. Army Corps of Engineers

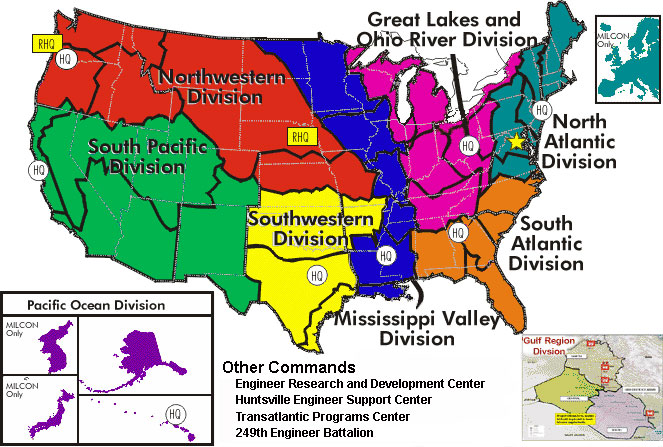
USACE Great Lakes and Ohio River Division, shown in fuchsia

The United States Army Corps of Engineers Great Lakes and Ohio River Division (LRD) is one of the eight permanent divisions of the Army organization, providing civil works and military water resource services/infrastructure. It also supports economically viable and environmentally sustainable watershed management and water resources development in its territory.

The Division, headquartered in Cincinnati, Ohio, covers the American industrial heartland, stretching from the St Lawrence Seaway, across all of the Great Lakes, down the Ohio River Valley to the Tennessee and Cumberland Rivers. It covers 355,300 square miles (920,000 km^{2}), parts of 17 states, and serves 56 million people.

The Division Commander is directly responsible to the Chief of Engineers. The LRD Commander directs and supervises the individual District Commanders, and also serves on two national and international decision-making bodies: co-chair of the Lake Superior, Niagara, and Ontario/St Lawrence Seaway boards of control; and the Mississippi River Commission. In September 2011 Margaret W. Burcham became the first woman to command a USACE division when she was appointed commander of the Great Lakes and Ohio River Division.

LRD duties include:

- Preparing engineering studies and design.
- Constructing, operating, and maintaining flood control and river and harbor facilities and installations.
- Administering the laws on civil works activities.
- Acquiring, managing, and disposing of real estate.
- Mobilization support of military, natural disaster, and national emergency operations.

== Districts ==
The Division's seven districts are headquartered in:

- Buffalo, New York
- Chicago, Illinois
- Detroit, Michigan
- Louisville, Kentucky
- Nashville, Tennessee
- Pittsburgh, Pennsylvania
- Huntington, West Virginia
