= R.J. Garcia =

West Point commandant

Commandant of Cadets, United States Military Academy
- Preceded by: Lori L. Robinson

Personal details
- Education: United States Military Academy (BS), Kansas State University (MS), Army War College (MSS)
- Awards: Defense Superior Service Medal, Legion of Merit, Bronze Star, Meritorious Service Medal, Air Medal, Army Commendation Medal, Joint Service Achievement Medal, Army Achievement Medal, Combat Action Badge, Senior Army Aviator Badge, Air Assault Badge, Army Staff Badge

Military service
- Allegiance: United States
- Branch/service: United States Army
- Years of service: 1996-Present
- Rank: Brigadier General
- Commands: Commandant of Cadets, United States Military Academy 25th Combat Aviation Brigade, 25th Infantry Division 3-6 CAV, 1st Armored Division B Company, 1-3 ATKHB, 3rd Infantry Division
- Battles/wars: Operation Iraqi Freedom Operation Iraqi Freedom 09-10 Operation Inherent Resolve

R.J. Garcia is a United States Army brigadier general currently serving as the 81st Commandant of Cadets at the United States Military Academy (USMA), commonly known as West Point. He most recently served as the Deputy Commanding General - Support of the 25th Infantry Division from 2023-2024, and prior to that he served as the Executive Officer to the Deputy Commander, U.S. Indo-Pacific Command, Camp H.M. Smith from 2021-2023.

== Early life and education ==
Garcia was born in Dallas, Texas and raised in San Antonio. He is an Eagle Scout and was member of Troop 346 in San Antonio's Alamo Area Council, BSA. He graduated from Tom C. Clark High School in 1992. He was nominated to West Point by Senator Phil Gramm and graduated with a degree in civil engineering in 1996. He subsequently earned master's degrees from Kansas State University and the U.S. Army War College.

== Military career ==
After graduating from West Point, Garcia was commissioned into the Army Aviation Branch and served in various locations and duty positions in the U.S. and overseas. These include duty with 1-2 Attack Helicopter Battalion "Gunfighters," 2nd Infantry Division, Republic of Korea; 1-4 Attack Helicopter Battalion "Dragons," 4th Infantry Division, Fort Hood, Texas; 1-3 Attack Helicopter Battalion "Vipers," 3rd Infantry Division, Hunter Army Airfield, GA; Aviation Branch, U.S. Army Human Resources Command, Alexandria, VA; U.S. Army Aviation Center of Excellence, Fort Rucker, AL; 4-227 Attack Reconnaissance Battalion "Guns," 1st Cavalry Division, Fort Hood, Texas; the U.S. Military Academy at West Point; 3-6 Heavy Attack Reconnaissance Squadron "Heavy Cav," 1st Armored Division, Fort Bliss, Texas; Headquarters Department of the Army, G-3-5-7 (DAMO-AV); 25th Combat Aviation Brigade "Wings of Lightning," 25th Infantry Division, Schofield Barracks, Hawaii; and U.S. Indo-Pacific Command, Camp H.M. Smith, Hawaii.

Garcia has deployed multiple times to the Middle East in support of the Global War on Terrorism, including the initial invasion of Iraq in 2003 with the 3rd Infantry Division, Operation Iraqi Freedom 09-10 with the 1st Cavalry Division, and Operation Inherent Resolve (2015-2016) as the Commander of 3-6 Heavy Attack Reconnaissance Squadron in support of the 82nd Airborne Division and CJTF-OIR.

Garcia's military education includes the Initial Entry Rotary Wing Aviator Course, Aviation Officer Basic Course, Aviation Officer Advanced Course, Army Command and General Staff College, U.S. Army War College, and AH-64A and AH-64D Aircraft Qualification Courses.

In April 2023, the Army announced that Garcia would succeed Lori L. Robinson as Commandant of Cadets. He assumed the role in June 2024.

== Awards and decorations ==
Garcia's awards and decorations include the Defense Superior Service Medal, Legion of Merit, Bronze Star, Meritorious Service Medal, Air Medal, Army Commendation Medal, Joint Service Achievement Medal, Army Achievement Medal, Combat Action Badge, Senior Army Aviator Badge, Air Assault Badge, and the Army Staff Badge. Garcia has been inducted into the Army Aviation Association of America Order of St. Michael (Silver) for his contributions and service to the Army Aviation Branch.
