= John H. Moellering =

United States Army general

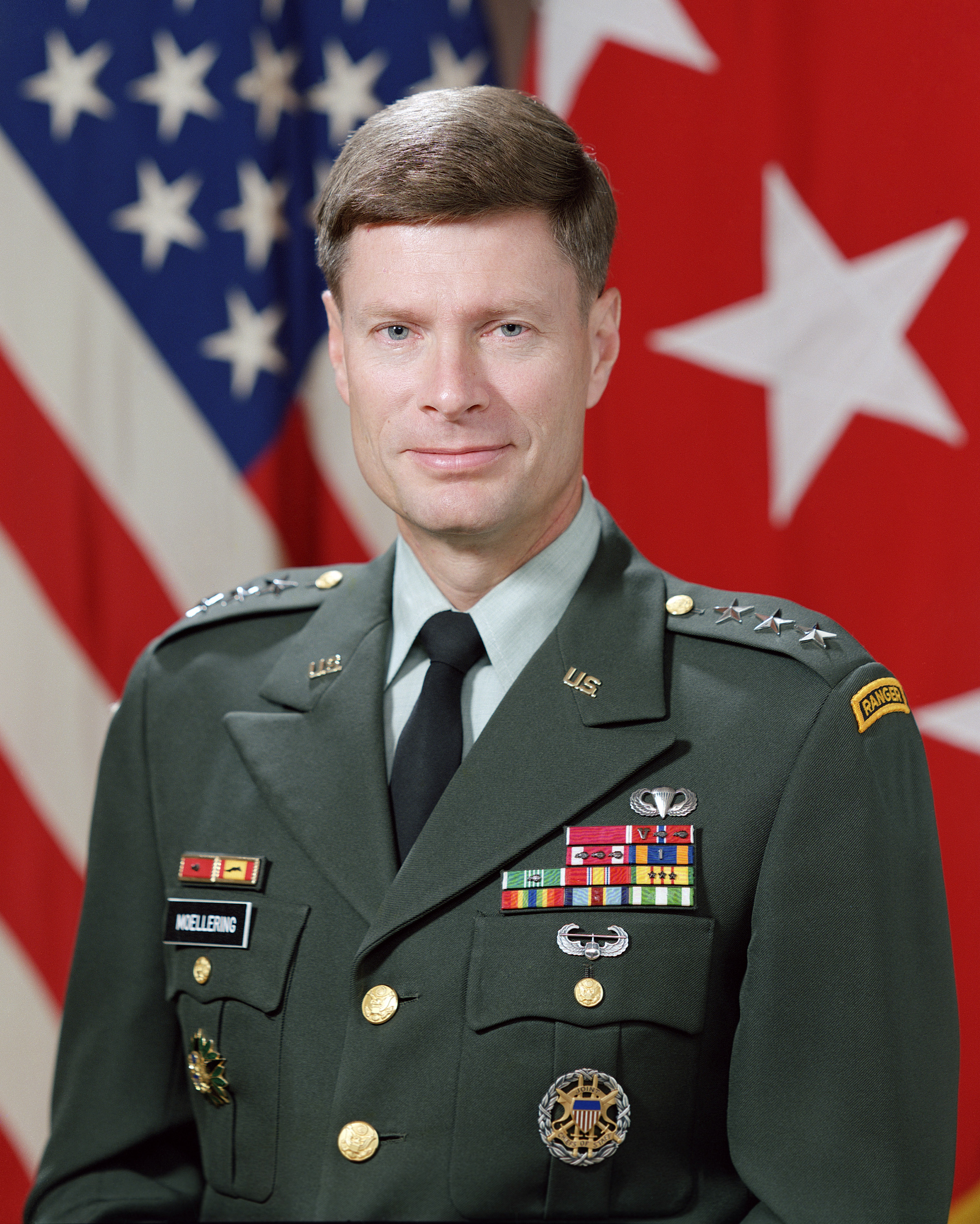
- Born: February 4, 1938 (age 88); Fort Wayne, Indiana U.S.
- Military career
- Allegiance: United States
- Branch: United States Army
- Service years: 1959–1987
- Rank: Lieutenant General
- Commands: U.S. Army Engineer Training Center; Corps of Cadets, U.S. Military Academy; Vicksburg District, U.S. Army Corps of Engineers; 326th Engineer Battalion

John Henry Moellering Sr. (born February 4, 1938) is a retired lieutenant general in the United States Army. He is a 1959 graduate of the United States Military Academy with a B.S. degree in engineering. Moellering also earned an M.S. degree in civil engineering from the University of California, Berkeley in 1962. As a brigadier general, he served as the 59th commandant of the Corps of Cadets at the Military Academy from 1982 to 1984. Moellering served as assistant to the Chairman of the Joint Chiefs of Staff from 1985 until his retirement in 1987.

== Personal ==
Moellering is the son of Robert Charles Moellering Sr. (October 29, 1909 – April 30, 2000) and Irene Pauline (Nolde) Moellering (June 27, 1910 – August 28, 1995). He had two brothers and a sister.

Moellering married Karla Louise Fritzsche on December 21, 1963, in Arlington, Virginia. The couple have two sons and a daughter.

Moellering was selected as a White House Fellow in 1973, serving on the White House Staff. He was named a Distinguished Graduate of West Point in 2015. After retiring from the Army, he became president and CEO of Lear Siegler Services, Inc from 1990 to 2003. He was also Chairman of USAA 2007–2012. He is a member of the Adjunct Faculty of Kenan-Flagler Business School at University of North Carolina and serves on the board of RTI, International.
