= Vincent K. Brooks =

American four star Army general (born 1958)

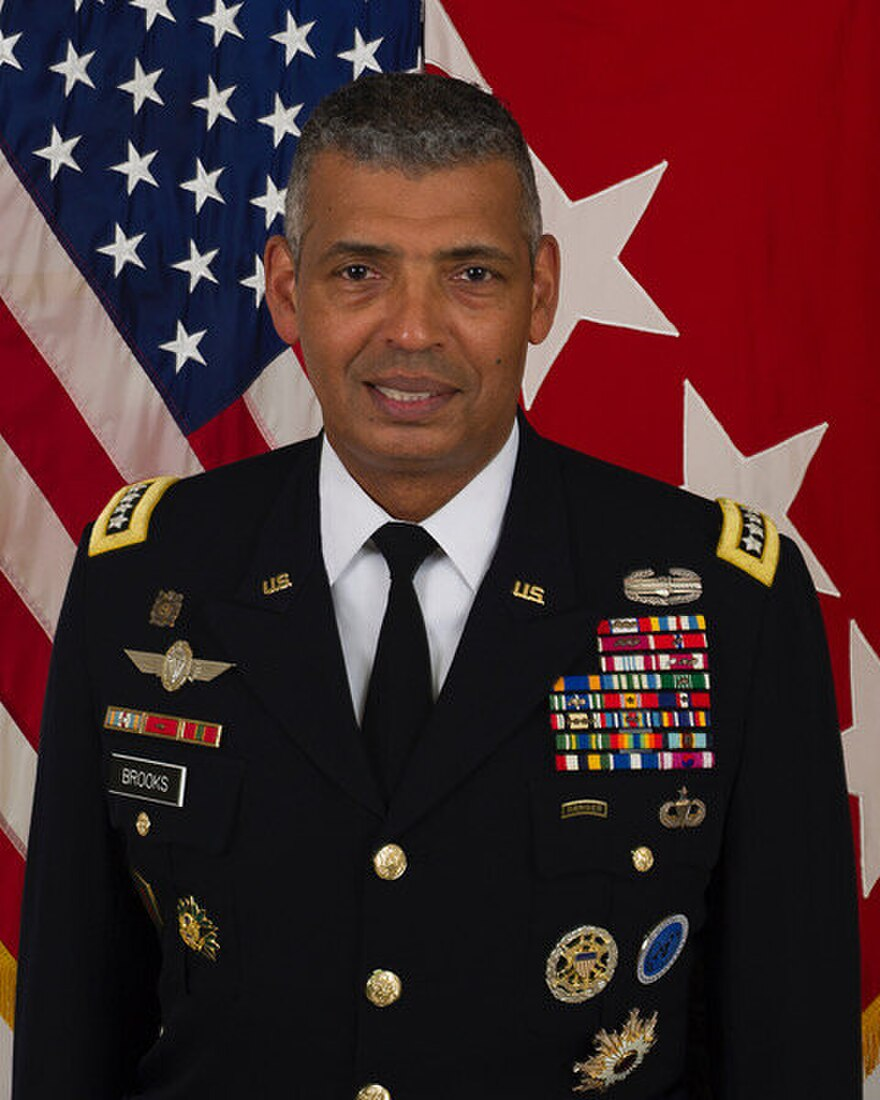
- General Vincent K. Brooks
- Born: 24 October 1958 (age 67); Anchorage, Alaska
- Relatives: Major General Leo A. Brooks Sr. (father); Naomi Brooks (mother); Brigadier General Leo A. Brooks Jr. (brother); Francis K. Brooks (uncle); Brigadier General Mark C. Quander (cousin)
- Military career
- Allegiance: United States
- Branch: United States Army
- Service years: 1980–2019
- Rank: General
- Commands: United States Forces Korea; United Nations Command; ROK-U.S. Combined Forces Command; United States Army Pacific; Third Army; 1st Infantry Division; 1st Cavalry Division; 1st Brigade Combat Team, 3rd Infantry Division; 2nd Battalion, 9th Infantry Regiment
- Conflicts: Kosovo War; War in Afghanistan; Iraq War
- Awards: Defense Distinguished Service Medal; Army Distinguished Service Medal (4); Defense Superior Service Medal; Legion of Merit (4); Bronze Star Medal (2)

Vincent Keith Brooks (born 24 October 1958) is a retired United States Army general who last commanded United States Forces Korea, United Nations Command, and ROK-U.S. Combined Forces Command. He previously served as the commanding general of United States Army Pacific and prior to that as the commanding general of Third Army. Brooks was the United States Central Command Deputy Director of Operations during the War in Iraq, and frequently briefed the media, which raised his public profile. He also served as the Chief of Army Public Affairs The Pentagon. He was the deputy commander of 1st Cavalry Division in Baghdad during the 2006–2008 "surge" and upon returning to the United States became the commanding general of the same division. He later was commanding general of the 1st Infantry Division. Brooks assumed command in Korea on 30 April 2016, and was succeeded by Robert B. Abrams in November 2018, then retired on 1 January 2019.

== Family ==
Brooks was born in Anchorage, Alaska, on 24 October 1958. He grew up as an Army brat in a prominent military family in California. His father, Major General Leo A. Brooks Sr., and brother, Brigadier General Leo A. Brooks Jr., both retired after careers in the United States Army. His uncle, Francis K. Brooks, was the majority leader of the Vermont House of Representatives and a member of the Vermont Senate. Brooks attended Thomas Jefferson High School in Alexandria, Virginia for two years, and then Jesuit High School in Carmichael, California, where he graduated in 1976. He was a varsity basketball player, and decided to follow his brother to United States Military Academy at West Point to earn a commission as an officer.

== Military service ==
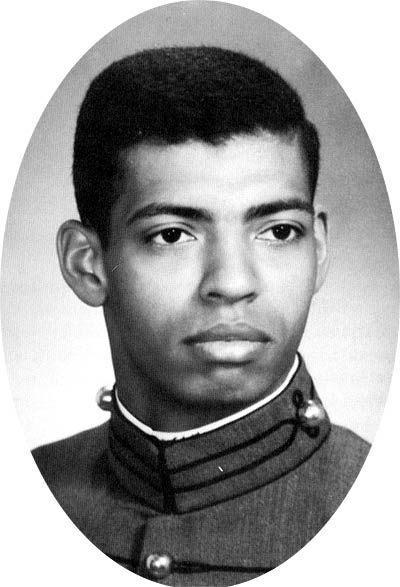
Brooks as a cadet in 1980

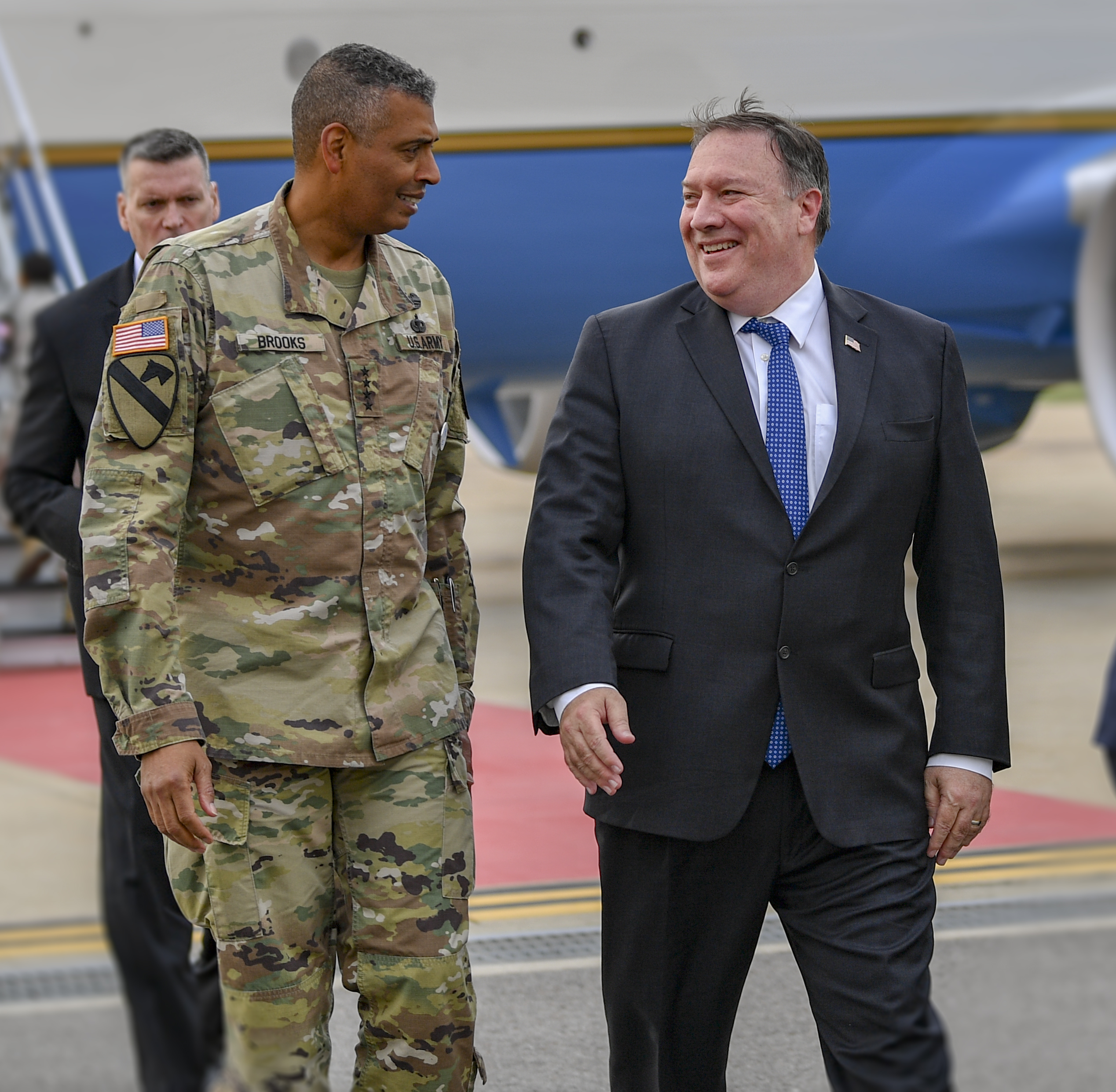
Brooks with Secretary of State Mike Pompeo in 2018

At West Point, Brooks was the academy's first African-American First Captain, the highest position (Cadet Brigade Commander) a cadet can hold, an appointment which brought much public visibility at an early age in life. He graduated from West Point in 1980.

After graduating, Brooks served in South Korea and Kosovo among other places. In Kosovo, he concurrently served as the deputy commander of the U.S. force in Kosovo (Task Force Falcon) and as commander of the 1st Brigade, 3rd Infantry Division based at Fort Stewart in Georgia. From that position he moved to the Joint Chiefs of Staff at the Pentagon. While serving there he was temporarily assigned to be deputy director of Operations at United States Central Command (CENTCOM). Returning to the Pentagon and the Joint Staff in April 2003, he became the Lead Strategic Planner for the Global War on Terrorism working closely with the CIA, the Departments of State, Treasury and Justice, the FBI and the military's United States Special Operations Command (SOCOM).

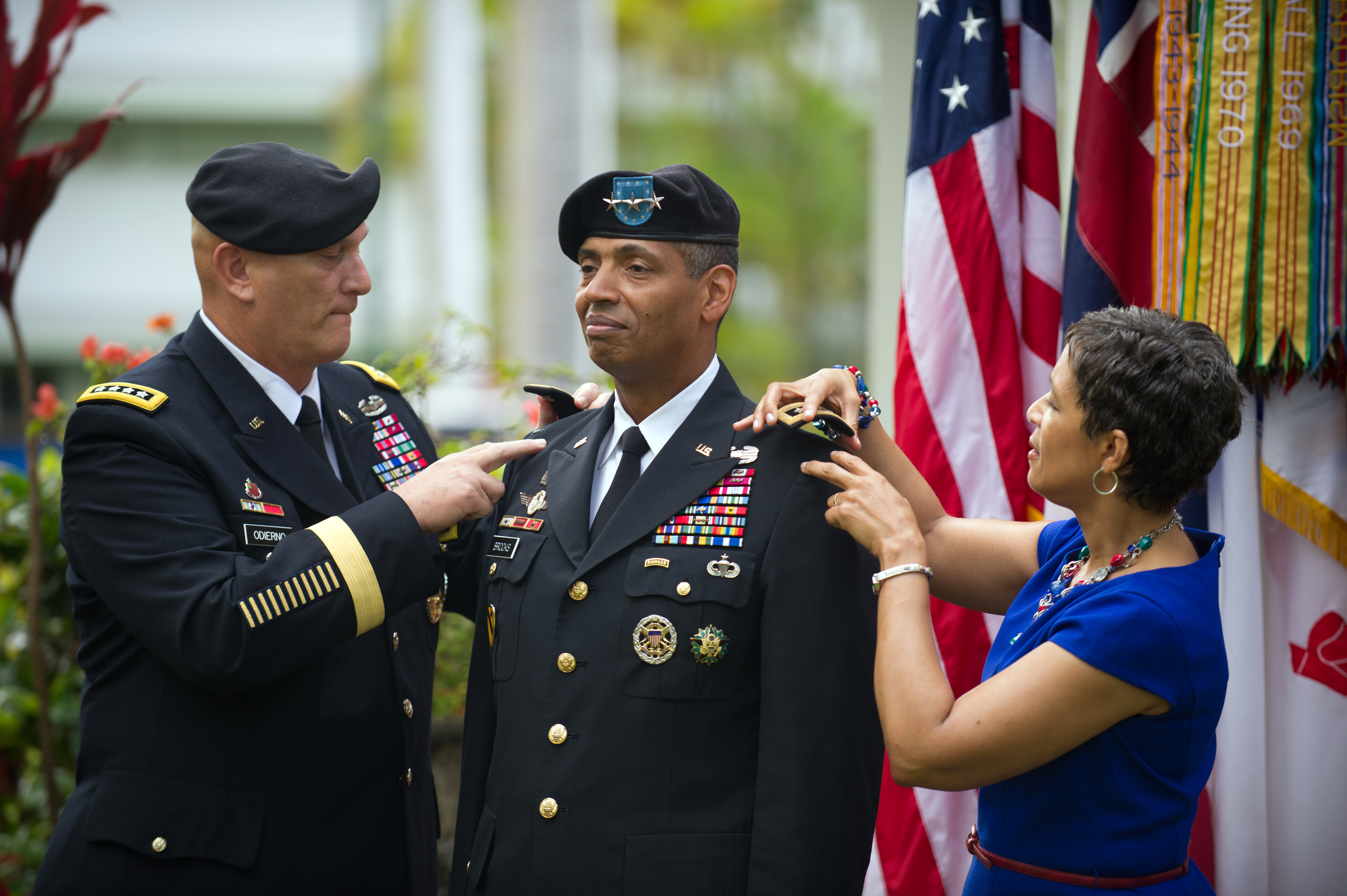
Army Chief of Staff Gen. Raymond T. Odierno and Dr. Carol Brooks promote Lt. Gen. Vincent Brooks to the rank of general during a ceremony at Fort Shafter, Hawaii, 2 July 2013.

In his role as deputy director of Operations, Brooks also became the spokesperson of CENTCOM, the main force in the Middle East. At that time he was the youngest general officer in the army.

From 2006 to 2008 Brooks served as the Deputy Commanding General of the 1st Cavalry Division, serving for fifteen months in Baghdad as second-in-command of the main effort (Multinational Division – Baghdad) stabilizing the Iraqi capital city and province during what is now called "The Surge." Upon return from Iraq, he took command of the 1st Cavalry Division until April 2008. Following an assignment as the Deputy Commanding General of the Army's III (Third) Corps at Fort Hood, Texas, he again took command of a combat unit, serving as the Commanding General of the historic 1st Infantry Division at Fort Riley in Kansas from April 2009 to May 2011. He deployed the unit to Iraq for a year, serving as U.S. Division – South, responsible for securing the heavily Shi'ite areas of the southern half of the country. The headquarters was in Basra, Iraq. Following two years in a second division-level command, Brooks took command of U.S. Army Central and Third Army responsible for all U.S. Army operations throughout the Middle East and Central Asia (from Egypt to Kazakhstan). During this time, Brooks oversaw the reduction of forces in Iraq as well as the build up of forces in Afghanistan.

As the Commanding General of United States Army Pacific and as a part of the "Asia Pivot" of the Obama administration foreign policy, Brooks envisioned and executed the "Pacific Pathways" program. The program consists of a single United States Army unit that would move to different countries of the Asia and Pacific regions for up to three months at a time to develop first-hand understanding of the region. While initially criticized in some circles, the innovative approach has met high acclaim from the countries of the region and the units involved in the missions.

In March 2016, Brooks was nominated to command United States Forces Korea, the U.S.-South Korea Combined Forces Command, and United Nations Command, succeeding General Curtis Scaparrotti. He served until October 2018, and was succeeded by Robert B. Abrams. On 4 November 2016, Brooks was bestowed the Korean name Park Yu-jong (Note: In this Korean name, the family name is Park.) (Korean: 박유종; Hanja: 朴侑鍾) by the ROK-US Alliance Friendship Association to show appreciation for his contributions to strengthening relations between the American and Korean armed forces. He also received a scroll and a taekwondo black belt and uniform inscribed with the moniker. Brooks retired on 1 January 2019, following the completion of his command assignment in Korea.

== Retirement ==
After retiring from the U.S. military, Brooks has served as a director on multiple corporate boards, including Diamondback Energy and the project management and engineering firm Jacobs, which contracts heavily with the U.S. military. He is also a principal with WestExec Advisors, a consulting firm that helps "defense corporations market their products to the Pentagon and other agencies," according to the Project On Government Oversight.

== Awards and decorations ==
Expert Infantryman Badge
Combat Action Badge
Ranger tab
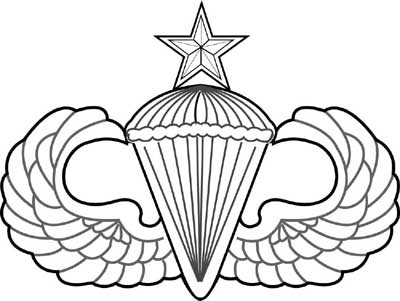
Senior Parachutist Badge
Joint Chiefs of Staff Identification Badge
Army Staff Identification Badge
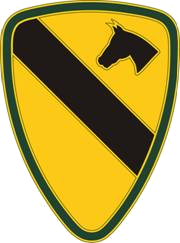
1st Cavalry Division Combat Service Identification Badge
United Nations Command Badge
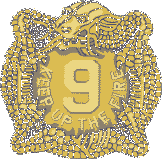
9th Infantry Regiment Distinctive Unit Insignia
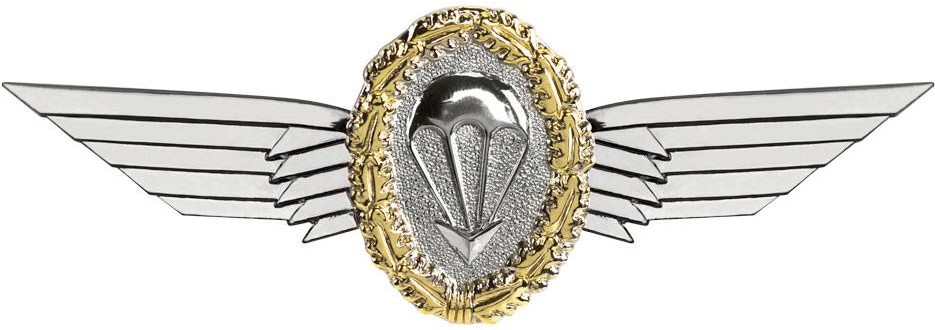
Silver German Parachutist Badge
7 Overseas Service Bars

Defense Distinguished Service Medal
Army Distinguished Service Medal with three bronze oak leaf clusters
Defense Superior Service Medal
Legion of Merit with three bronze oak leaf cluster
Bronze Star Medal with oak leaf cluster
Defense Meritorious Service Medal
Meritorious Service Medal with one silver and two bronze oak leaf clusters
Air Medal
Joint Service Commendation Medal
Army Commendation Medal with one bronze oak leaf cluster
Army Achievement Medal with two bronze oak leaf clusters
Joint Meritorious Unit Award with silver oak leaf cluster
Meritorious Unit Commendation with one bronze oak leaf cluster
Superior Unit Award
National Defense Service Medal with one bronze service star
Kosovo Campaign Medal with one bronze service star
Iraq Campaign Medal with four service stars
Global War on Terrorism Expeditionary Medal with two service stars
Global War on Terrorism Service Medal
Korea Defense Service Medal
Army Service Ribbon
Army Overseas Service Ribbon with bronze award numeral 6
NATO Medal for Kosovo
Inter-American Defense Board Medal
Order of the Rising Sun, Grand Cordon (Japan)
Order of National Security Merit, Tong-il Medal (Republic of Korea)

== Family ==
- Father : Leo A. Brooks Sr. - Major General of the United States Army (retired)
  - Brother : Leo A. Brooks Jr. - Brigadier General of the United States Army (retired)
- Uncle : Francis K. Brooks - the Vermont Senate (2017–2019)
- Cousin : Mark C. Quander - Major General of the United States Army

== Notes ==
Military offices
Preceded by Perry L. Wiggins	Commanding General of the 1st Infantry Division; 2009–2011	Succeeded by William C. Mayville Jr.
Preceded by William G. Webster	Commanding General of the Third United States Army; 2011–2013	Succeeded by James L. Terry
Preceded by Francis J. Wiercinski	Commander of the United States Army Pacific; 2013–2016	Succeeded by Robert B. Brown
Preceded by Curtis M. Scaparrotti	Commander of the United Nations Command; Commander of the United States Forces Korea; Commander of the ROK/US Combined Forces Command; 2016–2018	Succeeded by Robert B. Abrams
