= Frederick W. Sibley =

United States Army general

Frederick William Sibley
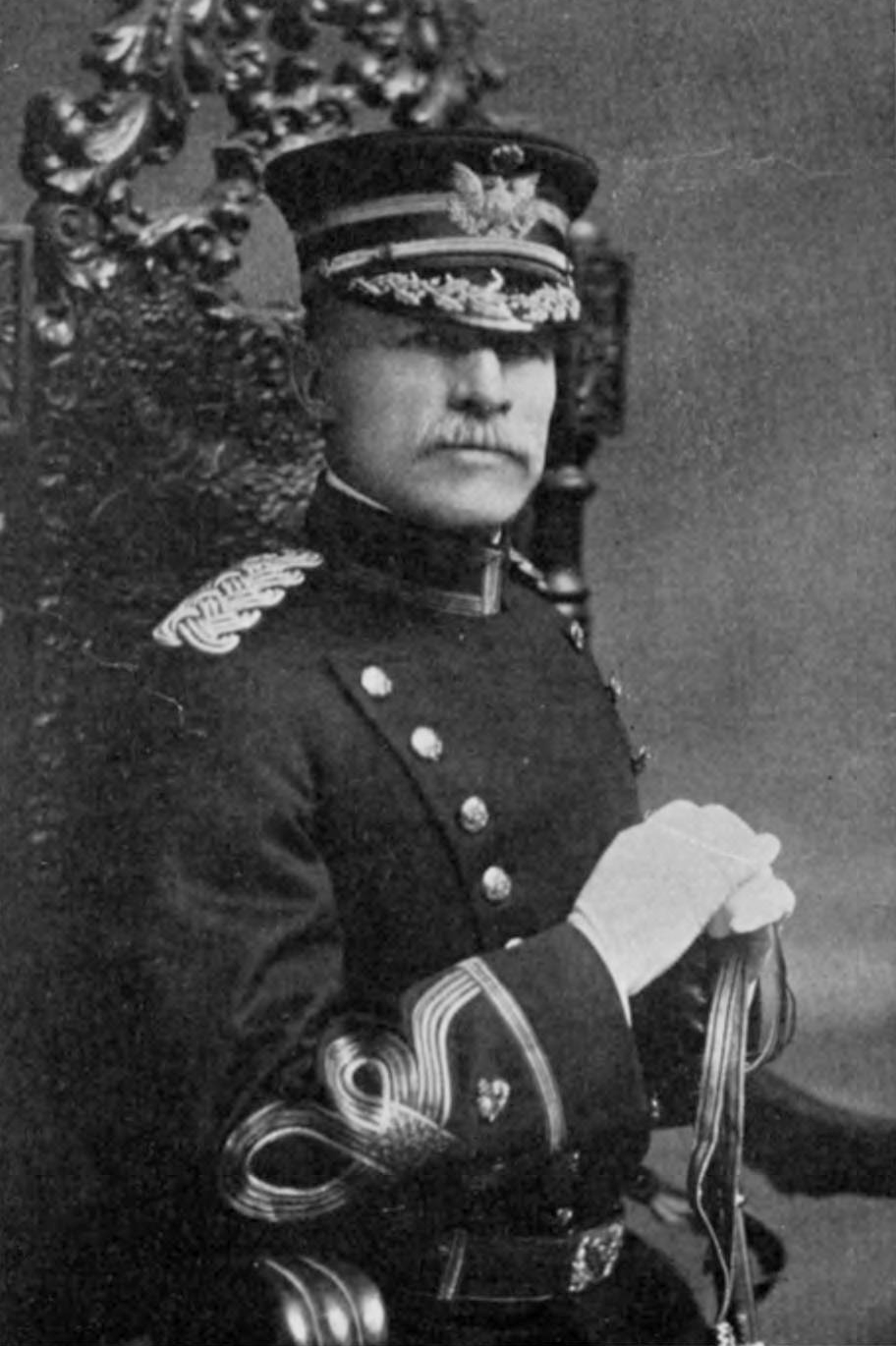
- At West Point in 1909
- Born: October 17, 1852; Fort Phantom Hill, Texas, United States
- Died: February 17, 1918 (aged 65); Rockford, Illinois, United States
- Burial place: Arlington National Cemetery
- Spouse: Fannie Lane (m. 1877)
- Military career
- Allegiance: United States of America
- Branch: United States Army
- Service years: 1874–1917 (USA)
- Rank: Brigadier General (USA)
- Units: 2nd U. S. Cavalry Regiment (1874–1902); 11th U. S. Cavalry Regiment (1902–1911)
- Commands: Commandant of Cadets; 14th U. S. Cavalry Regiment (1911–1916)
- Conflicts: American Indian Wars: Sioux Wars; Big Horn Expedition; Battle of Powder River; Battle of Rosebud; Sibley Scout; Battle of Slim Buttes; Spanish–American War: served within Continental U.S.; Border War: Pancho Villa Expedition

Frederick William Sibley (October 17, 1852 – February 17, 1918), was a career United States Army officer. In addition to serving during the Indian Wars, he was Commandant of Cadets at the United States Military Academy from 1908 to 1911.

== Early life ==
Frederick W. Sibley was born at Fort Phantom Hill in Texas on October 17, 1852, to U.S. Army Colonel Caleb C. Sibley and Nancy Davenport-Sibley. In 1869 at the age of 16, Frederick was admitted to the United States Military Academy at West Point from Georgia, and graduated in the class of 1874.

== Indian Wars ==
Sibley was commissioned a Second Lieutenant in the 2nd United States Cavalry Regiment on June 17, 1874, and initially stationed in Nebraska before moving to Wyoming Territory. In March 1876, he participated with Company E, 2nd Cavalry in the Big Horn Expedition, and on March 17, fought with his company in the Battle of Powder River, Montana Territory. Three months later on June 17, Sibley participated in the Battle of the Rosebud under General George Crook. The battle was a defeat for Crook's men, and they retreated to Goose Creek in Wyoming Territory.

=== Sibley Scout ===
After remaining idle for more than two weeks at Goose Creek, on July 6, 1876, General Crook ordered Lieutenant Sibley to take 25 men and two scouts, Big Bat Pourier and Frank Grouard, and make a reconnaissance to the north to locate Indians. Two civilians joined Sibley's party, bringing the total up to 30 men. While traveling down the Tongue River in the vicinity of present-day Dayton, Wyoming, the scouting party discovered a large party of Sioux and Cheyenne warriors moving south very close to them. Their only chance of escape was to take a trail to the Bighorn Mountains. The war party followed closely, and after surviving attacks by pursuing Indians, the patrol abandoned their horses and traveled deep into the rough steep terrain of the Tongue River Canyon system on foot. Over several days the group was able to evade the Indian force, after which they walked over thirty miles out of the mountains back to the Goose Creek camp, arriving worn out and fatigued but with no casualties. For this event, Lieutenant Sibley was brevetted to First Lieutenant for "gallantry in action on the Little Big Horn River." In July 1876, he was recommended for the Medal of Honor.

On September 9–10, 1876, the now First Lieutenant Sibley participated in the Battle of Slim Buttes, in Dakota Territory.

== Later service ==
On September 1, 1877, at Fort Sanders, Wyoming, Sibley married Fannie Lane, the daughter of Colonel E. D. Lane. He then served as the Adjutant of the 2nd U.S. Cavalry from 1889 until 1893. In 1898, during the Spanish–American War, Sibley commanded the Headquarters Guard of the IV Army Corps, under Major General John J. Coppinger. He again served as the Adjutant of the 2nd U.S. Cavalry from 1899 to 1900. In 1900, Sibley became the Inspector General of the Department of Texas and remained in that position until the following year. In 1902 he was promoted to the Major of the 11th United States Cavalry Regiment. He was then made the Adjutant General of the Department of Luzon, in the Philippines from 1903 to 1904, and was in command of squadrons of the 2nd Cavalry and battalions of the 7th U. S. Infantry, which suppressed Landrones of Cavite and Bantangas Provinces, 1905, returning invalided to the United States. He was selected for detail to the General Staff but declined the position in December 1908. From February 1, 1908, until February 1, 1911, Sibley served as the 28th Commandant of Cadets at West Point. He was then promoted to the Colonelcy of the 14th United States Cavalry Regiment on March 3, 1911. In that position, Sibley took part in the Pancho Villa Expedition of the Border War into Mexico in 1916. In July 1916 he was appointed a Brigadier General, and due to his age, retired from the United States Army in October 1917 after 42 years of service in the United States Cavalry. Frederick W. Sibley died in Rockford, Illinois on February 17, 1918, and is buried beside his wife Fanny in Section 2 of the Arlington National Cemetery in Washington, D.C.

Military offices
Preceded by Robert Lee Howze	Commandant of Cadets of the United States Military Academy; 1908–1911	Succeeded by Fred Winchester Sladen
