= Sacramento Army Depot =

Coordinates: 38°31′08″N 121°23′48″W

Joint Munitions Command
- Active: 1941 - March 3, 1995
- Country: United States

The Sacramento Army Depot (SAAD) was a 485-acre (1.96 km^{2}) facility located within current city limits, 7 miles (11 km) southeast of downtown Sacramento, California, in Sacramento County. SAAD was activated in 1941. It served as a repair facility for electronic equipment, such as night vision goggles, electronic circuit boards, and radium-dial instrumentation. The depot was deactivated after the findings of the 1988 Base Realignment and Closure Commission. The depot officially closed on March 3, 1995. On July 22, 1987, the depot was added to the National Priorities List as a Superfund site.
