= Leo A. Brooks Sr. =

United States general (born 1932)

- Born: August 9, 1932 (age 94); Alexandria, Virginia, U.S.
- Relatives: Brigadier General Leo A. Brooks Jr. (son); General Vincent K. Brooks (son); Brigadier General Mark C. Quander (nephew)
- Military career
- Allegiance: United States
- Branch: United States Army
- Service years: 1954–1984
- Rank: Major General
- Commands: Defense Personnel Support Center; Army Troop Support Agency; 13th Corps Support Command; Sacramento Army Depot
- Conflicts: Vietnam War
- Awards: Army Distinguished Service Medal; Defense Superior Service Medal; Legion of Merit (3); Bronze Star Medal

Leo Austin Brooks Sr. (born August 9, 1932) is a retired major general of the United States Army who later became city manager of Philadelphia.

== Military career ==
Brooks was born in Alexandria, Virginia, on August 9, 1932. He graduated from Virginia State University in 1954 and received his commission in the Army Quartermaster Corps as a Distinguished Graduate of the Reserve Officer Training Corps.

In his early assignments, Brooks served as a platoon leader with the 2nd Infantry Division in Alaska and commanded two companies. He also served in the office of the Army's Deputy Chief of Staff for Logistics, G-4, as a budget liaison to the United States Congress.

Brooks served two tours of duty in Vietnam during the Vietnam War, one as an advisor to the Army of the Republic of Vietnam and one as a battalion commander. He received a master's degree in financial management from George Washington University, and his later assignments included command of the Sacramento Army Depot, 13th Corps Support Command, Army Troop Support Agency, and Defense Personnel Support Center. Brooks retired from the military in 1984. Since he retired before serving three years as a major general, he was retired as a brigadier general.

Brooks' military education includes the United States Army Command and General Staff College and the National War College.

Brooks's awards include: the Army Distinguished Service Medal; Defense Superior Service Medal; Legion of Merit with two oak leaf clusters; Bronze Star Medal; Meritorious Service Medal; Joint Service Commendation Medal; and Army Commendation Medal.

== Later career ==
As Philadelphia's city manager he was involved in the 1985 raid and bombing of the communal headquarters of the black radical group, the MOVE organization. Brooks resigned from his position 10 days after the bombing; three years later, a Philadelphia grand jury cleared Brooks and others of criminal liability under Pennsylvania law, while describing their behavior as "morally reprehensible" and marked by "cowardice, incompetence, inexperience, and ineptitude".

== Family ==
Brooks was married to teacher Naomi Lewis (April 14, 1934 – May 21, 2020) from 1955 until her death in 2020. They had three children, including two sons who reached the ranks of general officers in the United States Army – General (Retired) Vincent K. Brooks and Brigadier General (Retired) Leo A. Brooks Jr. His nephew Mark Quander is on active duty in the rank of Major General. His daughter Marquita K. Brooks is an attorney. In addition, his brother Francis was a longtime member of the Vermont House of Representatives who rose to the position of majority leader. After serving in the House, Francis Brooks served for several years as the Sergeant at Arms of the Vermont State House. In 2016, Francis Brooks was elected to the Vermont Senate.
