= Leo A. Brooks Jr. =

Brigadier General in the United States Army (ret. 2006)

- Born: August 15, 1957 (age 69); Anchorage, Alaska
- Relatives: Major General Leo A. Brooks Sr. (father); Naomi Brooks (mother); General Vincent K. Brooks (brother); Brigadier General Mark C. Quander (cousin)
- Military career
- Allegiance: United States
- Branch: United States Army
- Service years: 1979–2006
- Rank: Brigadier General
- Commands: Commandant of Cadets; 1st Brigade, 82nd Airborne Division; 1st Battalion, 504th Parachute Infantry Regiment
- Awards: Army Distinguished Service Medal; Legion of Merit (2); Defense Meritorious Service Medal; Meritorious Service Medal (5)
- Other work: Boeing (2006–2020)

Leo Austin Brooks Jr. (born August 15, 1957) is a retired brigadier general of the United States Army. The Brooks family is noted for its military accolades and public service, as his brother is Army General Vincent K. Brooks, and their father Leo A. Brooks Sr. was a major general in the United States Army. His uncle, Francis K. Brooks, was the majority leader of the Vermont House of Representatives and a member of the Vermont Senate.

== Education ==
Brooks attended Sacramento's Jesuit High School in 1975. He then graduated from the United States Military Academy at West Point with a Bachelor of Science degree in 1979 and later earned a Master of Public Administration degree from the University of Oklahoma in 1990. He is currently a Senior Fellow at the Maxwell School of Government at Syracuse University as well as a Trustee at Norwich University.

== Decorations and awards ==
Brooks' awards and decorations include the Army Distinguished Service Medal, Legion of Merit with two oak leaf clusters, Defense Meritorious Service Medal, Meritorious Service Medal with four oak leaf clusters, Army Commendation Medal, Army Achievement Medal with two oak leaf clusters, and Multinational Force and Observers Medal. He is authorized to wear the Expert Infantryman Badge, Ranger Tab, Master Parachutist Badge, Pathfinder Badge and Air Assault Badge.

== Quotes ==
- "Building a moral and ethical environment is what you have to do to create character in your work world. You have to create leadership that will become trustworthy."
