= John Wallace Crawford =

American politician (1847–1917)

"Captain Jack" Crawford
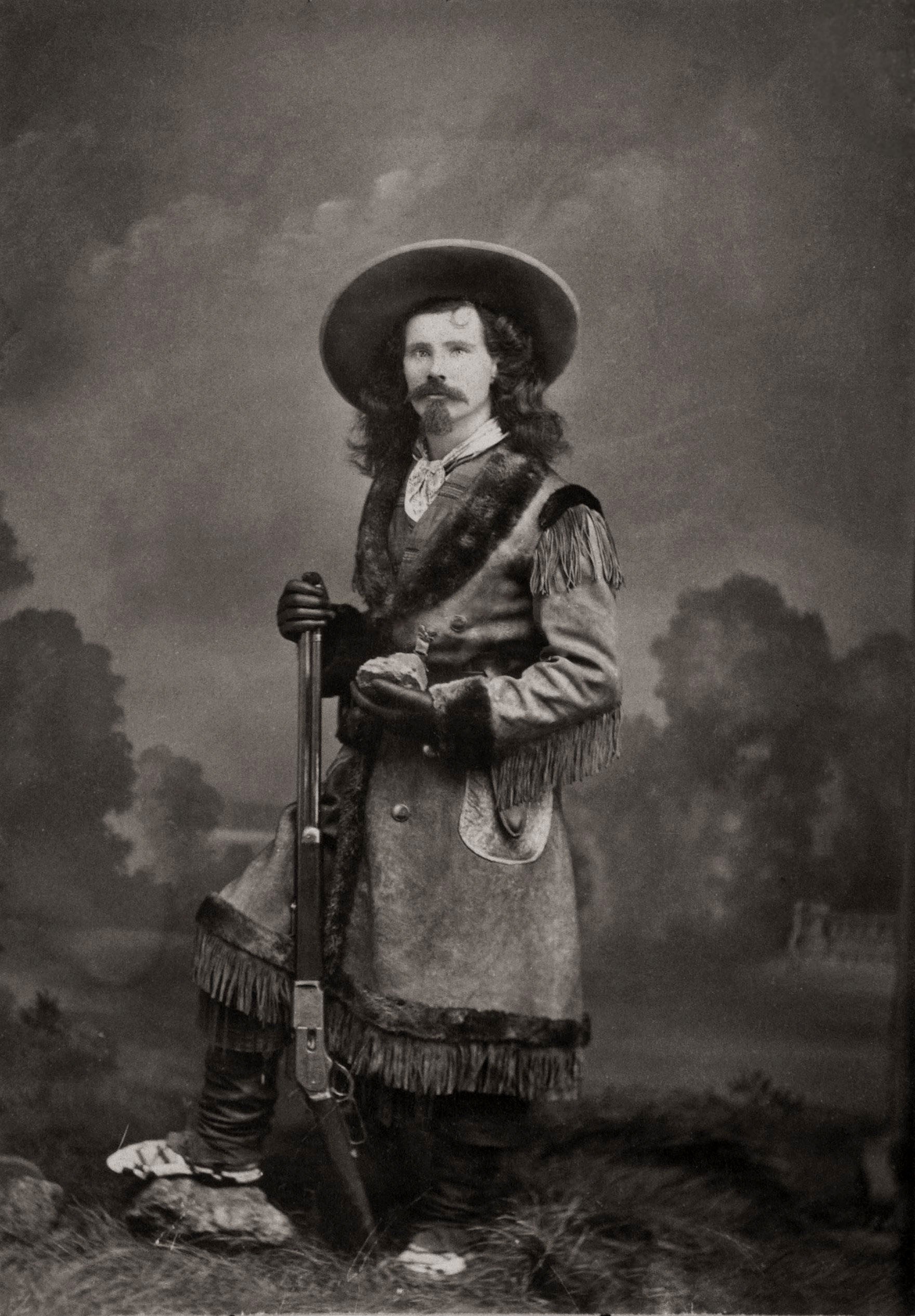
- Crawford in full Western attire, 1881.
- Born: John Wallace Crawford; March 4, 1847; Carndonagh, East Donegal, Ireland
- Died: February 27, 1917 (aged 69); Woodhaven, Long Island, New York

John Wallace ("Captain Jack") Crawford (1847–1917), known as "The Poet Scout", was an American adventurer, educator, and author. "Captain Jack" was a master storyteller about the Wild West and is known in American history as one of the most popular performers in the late nineteenth century. His daring ride of 350 miles in six days to carry dispatches to Fort Laramie for the New York Herald, to tell the news of the great victory by Gen. George Crook against the village of Chief American Horse at the Battle of Slim Buttes during the Great Sioux War of 1876-1877, made him a national celebrity.

== Early life ==
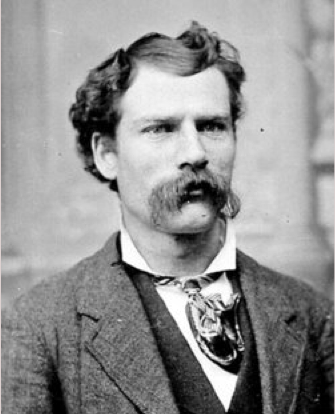
John Wallace "Captain Jack" Crawford

Crawford was born in Carndonagh, North Donegal, Ireland, on March 4, 1847. His parents were both born in Scotland. John Wallace's father, John A. Crawford, was banished from Scotland for making revolutionary speeches and fled to Ireland. Like many Scots-Irish of that time, the Crawfords moved and settled for a time in Ulster, in northern Ireland. At age fourteen, Crawford emigrated to the United States from Ireland, joining other members of his family who had preceded him to Minersville, Pennsylvania, the heart of the nation's anthracite coal region. In 1861, while his father marched away to war, young Crawford went to work in the mines to help support the family. At age seventeen, he enlisted in the Forty-eighth Pennsylvania Regiment volunteers and saw heavy fighting during the last stages of the Civil War. He was wounded twice, once at Spottsylvania and again at Petersburg, just days before Lee's surrender at Appomattox. While convalescing from the first wound in a Philadelphia hospital, young Crawford learned to read and write under the tutelage of a Sister of Charity. He would later incorporate his wartime experiences into his stage presentations.

At war's end, Crawford returned home and found a job in the coal mines at Centralia, Pennsylvania. He moved there with his parents, John A. and Susie Crawford. His father John A. became the town's tailor. The death of his mother two years later permanently influenced his life. On her deathbed, Susie Wallace Crawford exacted a promise from her son that "as long as he lived he would never drink liquor." The senior Crawford's addiction to strong drink had caused the family to suffer. In fact, one of Jack Crawford's earliest recollections was kneeling by his mother's side "praying God to save a wayward father and husband."' Crawford kept this promise for the rest of his life, becoming one of the few teetotal scouts that ever worked for the U.S. Army. This deathbed scene likewise found its way into Captain Jack's lectures and essays, contributing to Crawford's reputation as a leading temperance advocate. While in Centralia in September 1869, Jack married a local school teacher, Anna Maria Stokes, of Numidia, north of Centralia. Jack was appointed postmaster of Girardville, Pennsylvania and Jack and Anna Marie moved there. He was also an officer in the local miner's union. Together they had five children, including a girl who was named for Jack's friend William 'Buffalo Bill' Cody. Her name was May Cody Crawford.

== Black Hills Rangers ==
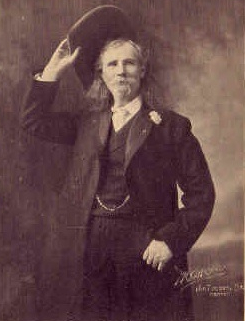
Captain Jack Crawford, "The Poet Scout"

In 1875, Jack headed west on the Black Hills Gold Rush. He would later claim that dime novels were among the influences that propelled him west. Jack spent the first six months of the nation's centennial year canvassing the gold camps as a correspondent for the Omaha Daily Bee. During these months, the residents of the mining settlement of Custer elected him to the town's first city council. In 1876, Custer City miners organized a 125-man militia known as the "Black Hills Rangers". Jack was appointed as chief of scouts, a troubleshooting unit of about twelve experienced fighting men, to look for Indian signs and escort emigrants through dangerous canyons where Indians often waited in ambush. He probably became "Captain Jack" when he took command of his company.

== Journalist ==
In 1876, Jack spent the first six months of the nation's centennial year canvassing the gold camps as a correspondent for the Omaha Daily Bee. After George Armstrong Custer's death on the Little Bighorn, Crawford joined Brig. Gen. George Crook's command as a civilian scout with the Fifth Cavalry on July 22, 1876. On July 24, 1876, Jack boarded a train for Cheyenne en route to Ft. Laramie and friends presented him with appropriate gifts: a new Winchester repeating rifle, cartridge belt, holster, hunting knife and sheath and a buckskin suit. "The management of the Omaha Daily Bee contributed 'liberally to his outfit' and paid tribute to its intrepid correspondent with these words: Captain Jack is a right good fellow, and we hope to see him distinguish himself alongside of his old friend Buffalo Bill. Jack has done some good in advancing the interests of the Black Hills, and it was on this account that his Omaha friends took occasion to give him a handsome testimonial of their appreciation of his labors."

== The Great Sioux War of 1876-1877 ==
During the Great Sioux War of 1876 Crawford was civilian scout with the 5th Cavalry Regiment and war correspondent for the Omaha Bee with General George Crook's Yellowstone and Big Horn Expedition. Captain Jack is credited with carrying dispatches on a highly perilous route of 400 miles alone to Fort Fetterman, and he took part in the Horsemeat March of 1876, one of the most grueling marches in American military history. Crawford played a significant role in the Battle of Slim Buttes (1876) and made a daring ride of more than three hundred miles in six days to carry dispatches of the victory to Fort Laramie for the New York Herald. One of his most famous exploits included delivering a bottle of whiskey to Buffalo Bill Cody, while on campaign. Cody wrote of the incident in An Autobiography of Buffalo Bill:

On learning that I was with Crook, Crawford at once hunted me up, and gave me a letter from General Sheridan, announcing his appointment as a scout. He also informed me that he had brought me a present from General Jones, of Cheyenne. 'What kind of a present' I inquired, seeing no indication of any package about Jack. 'A bottle of whiskey!' he almost shouted. I clapped my hand over his mouth. News that whiskey was in the camp was likely to cause a raid ... I will say in passing that I don't believe there is another scout in the West that would have brought a full bottle of whiskey 300 miles.

== Captain Jack joins Gen. Crook's command ==
Captain Jack traveled for over two weeks, trying to catch up with General Crook's command. On July 24, 1876, Jack boarded a train for Cheyenne en route to Ft. Laramie. When Crawford reached Cheyenne, he discovered that the Fifth Cavalry had already left for Fort Laramie and was en route north to Fort Fetterman. On July 29, Jack arrived at Fort Fetterman and credited with carrying dispatches on a highly perilous route of four hundred miles. On August 2, Jack left Fort Fetterman and finally reached Crook's command camped on Rosebud Creek in Montana on August 8, 1876.

After a brief nap, Crawford located his friend Buffalo Bill, handed him some letters, and distributed other communications to officers and newspaper correspondents accompanying the expedition. He then turned over to Cody a present from a Mr. Jones, proprietor of the Jones House in Cheyenne. The gift was a bottle of sour-mash whiskey, which Jack had carried unharmed on his perilous journey to the Rosebud. In wiring of this incident in his autobiography, published in 1879, Cody whimsically remarked: "Jack Crawford is the only man I have ever known that could have brought that bottle of whiskey through without "accident befalling it, for he is one of the very few teetotal scouts I ever met. Indeed, Crawford made a good impression upon both officers and enlisted men, who considered his ride from Fetterman a "plucky undertaking."

"Our campfires were lively after Captain Jack joined us," recalled an officer. "He sang his songs, told his stories, recited his poems and kept his tireless jaw constantly wagging for our edification."

== Crook's Horsemeat March ==
Crook's "Horsemeat March" marked the beginning of one of the most grueling marches in American military history. Crook's command consisted of about 2,200 men: 1,500 cavalry, 450 infantry, 240 Indian scouts, and a contingent of civilian employees, including 44 white scouts and packers. Crook's civilian scouts included Frank Grouard, Baptiste "Big Bat" Pourier, Baptiste "Little Bat" Garnier, Captain Jack Crawford and Charles "Buffalo Chips" White. "Although Captain Jack's "yarns and rhymes" would help to relieve the monotony of camp life, Buffalo Bill grew bored by the inactivity and left the expedition to continue his theatrical career in the East. According to one newspaper account, it was on Cody's recommendation that Col. Wesley Merritt subsequently appointed Crawford to succeed Cody as chief of scouts of the 5th Cavalry Regiment." News of the defeat of General Custer at the Battle of the Little Big Horn on June 25 and 26, 1876, arrived in the East as the U.S. was observing its centennial. The American public was in dismay and calls to punish the Sioux and awaited the government's response. War correspondents with national newspapers fought alongside General Crook and reported the campaign by telegraph. Correspondents embedded with Crook were Robert E. Strahorn for the New York Times, Chicago Tribune and the Rocky Mountain News; John F. Finerty for the Chicago Times; Reuben Briggs Davenport for New York Herald and Joe Wasson for the New York Tribune and Alta California (San Francisco).

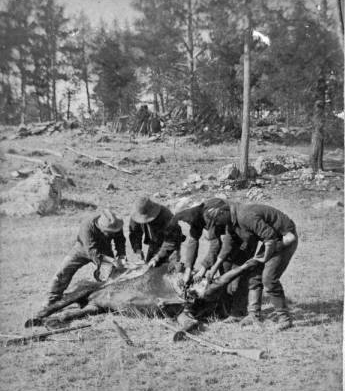
Soldiers cutting up abandoned horse on Crook's "Horsemeat March"

On August 26, 1876, with his men rationed for fifteen days, a determined General Crook departed from the Powder River and headed east toward the Little Missouri pursuing the Indians. Crook feared that Indians would scatter to seek game rather than meet the soldiers in combat after the fight with Custer. All other commanders had withdrawn from pursuit, but Crook resolved to teach the Indians a lesson. He meant to show that neither distance, bad weather, the loss of horses not the absence of rations could deter the U.S. Army from following up its wild enemies to the bitter end.

Strahorn reported that "all the infantrymen who could ride and who so wished were mounted on mules from the pack train. No circus ever furnished a better show in its mule-riding department than we enjoyed when those two hundred infantrymen essayed their first mount. Many of them had never been astride a horse and many of the mules had never been ridden. Tom Moore, Chief of Pack Trains, and his battalion of assistance, had the time of their lives trying to mount and hold the men in their saddles for the first hours of the performance. Not a few of the soldiers, after being pitched into the sagebrush and cactus a few times, contended they would sooner walk. However, galled but gallant, nearly two hundred stuck to the mules."

An accident befell Strahorn during the advance. During a rainstorm Strahorn became entangled in his gear and his horse bucked dragging him face first through prickly pear and cactus. With the help of surgeons, it took weeks to painfully extract the barbs. He remarked, "I was in good mood for an Indian fight or any other distracting adventure."

The days soon arrived when, on forced marches after the enemy, all discharges of firearms except at the enemy were strictly prohibited under severe penalty. Being out on the right flank one day, just out of sight of the troops, I came upon a beautiful covey of grouse. They were so tame I could almost knock them over with rocks, but while the contact thus established made me increasingly anxious for grouse for dinner that night, I could not hit them. So finally, in spite of those orders and with growing appetite, I shot two of them and quickly secreted the evidence of my disobedience by rolling them up in the rain coat I carried on my saddle. The right wing of the command was wildly excited by the shots. The skirmishers thrown out on that side soon discovered my lonely presence and hustled me to Colonel Chambers with the news that no Indians were visible. He very sternly asked. "Mr. Strahorn, did you do that firing?" Upon my answering, "Yes sir," he still more gruffly asked, "At Indians, or what?" "Not at Indians, Colonel, but at grouse," I answered. "I was so hungry for grouse that I just couldn't help it, so I'm ready to pay the penalty. What is it?" Be it remembered that I was in the Colonel's mess, and he replied quietly on the side, "Well, it will make a damn sight of difference whether you got a grouse."

Crook soon began running short of food and supplies and ordered his men to go on half rations. Many of the men were forced to subsist on horsemeat and was thereafter known as "General Crook's Horsemeat March." Without grain and adequate forage, horses and mules had weakened and many collapsed in the steady rain and mud. Crook had already given orders to shoot abandoned animals for food, and for several days his saddened, ragtag army would exist on a diet of mule and horsemeat.

The horses commenced to play out. As fast as the poor brutes fell the quartermaster had them killed and issued as rations, so the soldiers had nothing but played-out horses to eat from there on into the Hills. It looked funny to see a soldier ride his horse until it dropped exhausted, and then get off and shoot it and cut up its carcass up and issue meat to the soldiers of different companies. Gen. Crook would not take any advantage of his command. If they starved, he starved with them.

But the soldiers were nearing total exhaustion; wet, hungry, disheartened by constant hardships. One officer wrote that he saw: "men who were very plucky sit down and cry like children because they could not hold out." Years later, Colonel Andrew S. Burt reminisced with Crawford about the hardships they had shared on this grueling march: hunger, marching in the rain, sleeping on wet, muddy ground, eating horse meat. He vividly recalled Jack squatting on the ground before a campfire, "gnawing at a horse's rib flesh from the coals and glad to get the rib."

== Captain Mills's assault at Slim Buttes ==
=== Chief American Horse's village ===
On September 7, 1876, General Crook ordered Captain Anson Mills to take 150 troopers, riding upon the command's best horses, to the northernmost mining camps in the Black Hills to obtain food and supplies for his starving troops and hurry back. Accompanying Mills's command were civilian scouts Grouard and Crawford, and newspaper correspondents Strahorn and Davenport. Lieutenant John Wilson Bubb, the expedition commissary, had charge of sixteen packers and sixty-one pack mules. Mills's command left camp that same evening in "a thick mist," guided by Grouard, Crook's chief scout. About 1:00 a.m. the command stopped to rest, then moved on at daylight. On the afternoon of September 8, 1876, Grouard and Crawford and were ranging a mile or more in advance of Mills, and Grouard spied Indian hunters and ponies piled high with game. Further investigation revealed the presence Oglala Lakota Chief American Horse's village of Oglalas, Minneconjous, Brules and Cheyennes, numbering thirty-seven lodges and about 260 people, of whom 40 to 100 were warriors. The village lay compactly in a broad depression of ravines encircled by the spires of Slim Buttes, limestone and clay summits capped with pine trees near present-day Reva, South Dakota. Grouard and Crawford also found about 400 ponies grazing near the village. Tipis were clustered about the various ravines and streams that crisscrossed the natural amphitheater and smoke from the tipi fires hanging low beneath the misty clouds obscured the lodges. The village slept soundly in the cold rain.

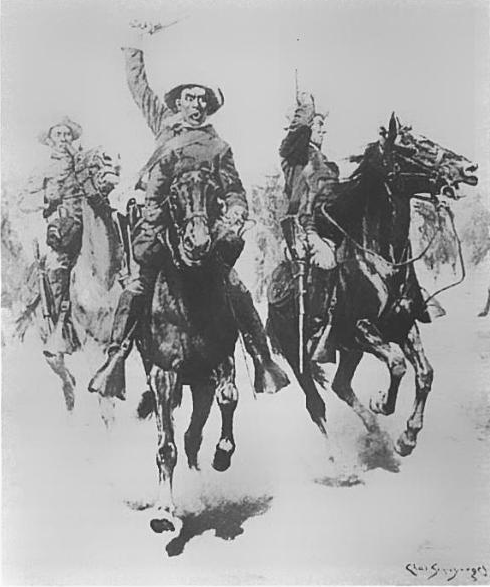
Lt. Schwatka's charge at Slim Buttes

=== Battle plan ===
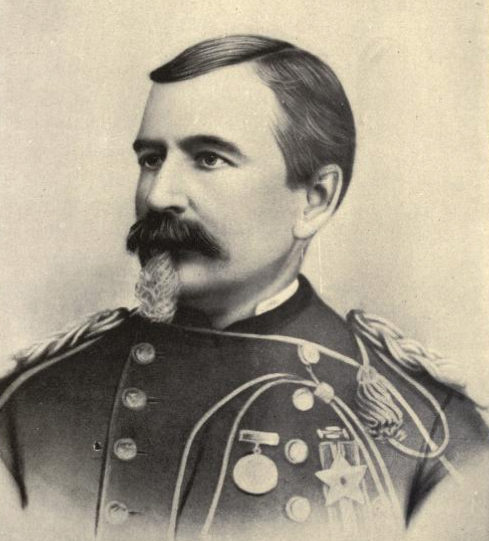
Col. Anson Mills

After learning of the village, Captain Mills sent Grouard on reconnaissance mission. Disguised as an Indian, Grouard, went through the village looking for the best point to attack. After consulting his officers and scouts, Mills decided to conduct an assault. Captain Mill's battle plan was the classic "dawn attack" in U.S. Army and Indian warfare. The goal was to surround the enemy, stampede and capture their stock, and kill many of the warriors as possible. On the evening of September 8, 1876, Captain Mills split his men into 4 groups to attack the village. Twenty-five were to remain hidden in a ravine a mile or so back, holding the horses and pack train. Lieutenant Frederick Schwatka would lead twenty-five mounted soldiers in a cavalry charge through the clustered lodges and stampede the Indians and their pony herd, all hands yelling and firing with revolvers to add to the confusion. One hundred dismounted cavalrymen split in two groups would surround the village as nearly as possible, shoot the stampeded warriors as they emerged from their tipis and capture the ponies. Lieutenant Emmet Crawford was ordered to post his fifty-seven troopers in skirmish order north and east of the camp, and Lieutenant Adolphus Von Luettwitz moved his fifty-three troopers east and south of the village. Both groups would open fire on the lodges and close in on foot once Schwatka's cavalry had routed the ponies and cleared the village area.

On the night before the assault, Strahorn did not even attempt to sleep. Thorough the night he and others alternatively sat and stood, holding their horses in the cold rain and mist. "Never before or since," he wrote in later years, "were hours so laggard or anxiety so great for the coming of dawn when we could do something that would heat the blood and cheer the soul to the forgetfulness of that everlasting soaking patter, patter of freezing rain."

However, before the full plan could be carried out, troopers startled the Indian pony herd and they stampeded through the village neighing the alarm to Indians, who cut their way out of tipis for an escape to the hills. Since all chance for a total surprise was lost, Mills ordered the immediate charge with Schwatka and his twenty-five men. Schwatka, joined by Grouard, Captain Jack and Strahorn thereupon charged and followed the ponies into the village firing pistols into the lodges. "Immediately, the dismounted detachments closed on the south side and commenced firing on the Indians." "The fleeing warriors managed to unleash one or two volleys at the soldiers, and Lieutenant Van Luettwitz's fell almost immediately, a bullet shattering his right kneecap as he stood on the knoll next to Mills. Instantly Captain Jack rushed over, tearing off the neckerchief he wore and fashioning a tourniquet about Van Luettwitz's wounded leg to check the flow of blood."

Taken by surprise the Indians fled. Strahorn recalled,

As usual, I could not be denied the thrill of the charge of the by the gallant twenty-five, and I'm sure that everything worked out as planned, except that many of the Indians escaped into a thicket in the bottom of a narrow gulch running along within a few yards of the nearest tepee, while a few others got away into the hills.

The Indians, finding themselves laced in their lodges, the leather drawn tight as a drum in the heavy rain, quickly cut themselves out with their knives and returned fire. Many were seen to fall, and even in the approaching daylight it was often tell whether the burdens carried were children or the slain and wounded. The squaws carried the dead, wounded and children up the opposite bluffs, leaving everything but their limited nightclothes in our possession. Most of the Indians fled splashing through the swollen creek and scrabbling into the heavy underbrush south of the stream bed and up the adjacent bluffs, taking advantage of Mill's failure to secure an effective cordon southwest of the tipis.

=== Entering the village ===
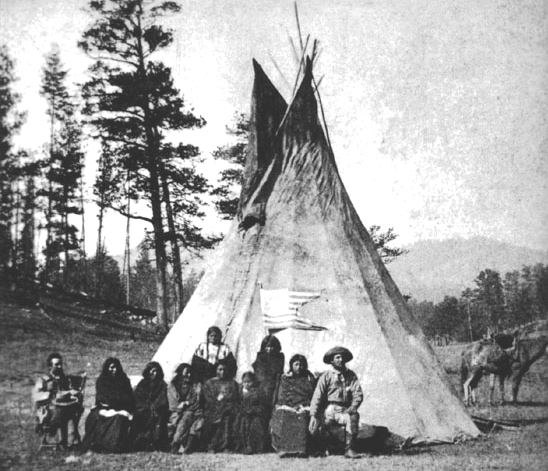
7th Cavalry Regiment guidon found at Slim Buttes fastened to the lodge of Chief American Horse.

After the Indians withdrew, Strahorn, Captain Jack and about fourteen volunteers, mostly packers, entered the deserted village to survey its contents. A mule pack was taken along to secure dried meat found hanging from poles. Immediately, the mule was killed by a shot and the men fired upon from Indians concealed in the bluffs. Drawing cross fire, the men quickly jumped into the bed of a dry ravine. Meanwhile, Captain Mills waited for a time, slowly entered the camp, and troopers were sent in groups through the village to check tipis and collect stores.

The picture we quickly presented in our movements around the battle field with the skirmishing still in progress, rifles in one hand and ravenously chewing at a great hunk of dried meat in the other, provoked much fun, and, with blessed momentary sunshine, a general forgetfulness of past troubles.

Chief American Horse's camp was a rich prize. "The lodges were full of furs and meat, and it seemed to be a very rich village. Crook seized and destroyed food, seized three or four hundred ponies, arms and ammunition, furs and blankets." In a dispatch written for the Omaha Daily Bee, Crawford described the cornucopia he encountered: "Tepees full of dried meats, skins, bead work, and all that an Indian's head could wish for." The troopers also captured about 300 fine ponies to partly replace their dead horses.

Of significance, troopers recovered items from the Battle of Little Bighorn, including a 7th Cavalry Regiment guidon from Company I, fastened to the lodge of Chief American Horse and the bloody gauntlets of slain Captain Myles Keogh. "One of the largest of the lodges, called by Grouard the "Brave Night Hearts," supposedly occupied by the guard, contained thirty saddles and equipment. One man found eleven thousand dollars in one of the tipis. Others found three 7th Cavalry horses; letters written to and by 7th Cavalry personnel; officers' clothing; a large amount of cash; jewelry; government-issued guns and ammunition.

=== Messengers to Crook ===
Promptly upon taking the village, Captain Mills sent two bareback riders to tell General Crook that he had a village and was trying to hold and needed assistance. When Crook received word from Mills's three messengers he could scarcely contain his anger at Mills. Crook was primarily interested in feeding his men and ordered Mills to avoid a fight should he encounter a large village, and instead, "cut around it" and go into the Black Hills to get supplies. Crook also told Mills that he expected to bivouac his exhausted men and therefore Mills could not expect any immediate support. Crook's Officers debated the propriety of Mills's attack on a hostile village of uncertain size, a controversy intensified by Custer's defeat under like circumstances. The question was especially provocative since Mills had opened the engagement with a small supply of ammunition. Strahorn reported, "Crook was very much disappointed because Mills didn't report his discovery last night, and there was plenty of time to have got the entire command there and so effectively surrounded the village that nothing would have escaped. But the General is also pleased, all things considered." Staff officers in telling the receipt of this news said Crook pushed the cavalry on with all possible haste, the infantry to follow more leisurely. But the tidings reaching Crook so electrified the immortal infantry that they forgot all about hunger, cold, wet and fatigue. Fortunately for Mills, Crook's column was not far behind. Crook assembled a relief contingent of about 250 men and 17 officers, plus surgeons Bennett A. Clements and Valentine T. Mcgillycuddy. John Frederick Finerty, war correspondent for the Chicago Times, joined the advance column. Despite the hardships of the Horsemeat March, the troopers were excited by the prospects of a battle.

=== Chief American Horse's defiance ===
At the onset of the stampede and cavalry charge, Chief American Horse with his family of three warriors and about twenty-five women and children retreated into one of the ravines that crisscrossed the village amongst the tipis. The winding dry gully was nearly 20 feet deep and ran some 200 yards back into a hillside. Trees and brush obstructed the view of the interior. "We found that some of the Indians had got into a cave at one side of the village. One of the men started to go past that spot on the hill, and as he passed the place he and his horse were both shot. This cave or dugout was down in the bed of a dry creek. The Indian children had been playing there, and dug quite a hole in the bank, so that it made more of a cave than anything else, large enough to hold a number of people." Troopers were alerted about the ravine when Private John Wenzel, Company A, Third Cavalry, became the first army fatality at Slim Buttes when he ill-advisedly approached the ravine from the front and a Sioux bullet slammed into his forehead. Winzel's horse was also shot and killed. An attempt was made to dislodge the Indians and several troopers were wounded.

Grouard and Big Bat Pourier crept close enough to the banks of the ravine to parley with the concealed Indians in endeavors to get them to surrender. But the savages were so confident of succor from Crazy Horse and his much larger force, who were encamped only a dozen miles to thee west, and to whom they had sent runners early in the morning, that they were defiant to the last.

These Indians felt no urgent need to surrender, for they defiantly yelled over to the soldiers more Sioux camps were at hand and their warriors would soon come to free them. Chief American Horse, anticipating relief from other villages, constructed a dirt breastworks in front of the cave and geared for a stout defense.

=== Indians regroup ===
Mills and Grouard soon realized a mistake had been made; Indians were firing back and the command was surrounded. After the firefight with Chief American Horse at the ravine, Mills sent yet another messenger, the third, to Crook. Mills decided against further efforts to expel the Indians and his men dug entrenchments facing the ravine. As soon as the warriors had their squaws and children in security, they returned to the contest and soon encompassed Mills's with a skirmish-line, whose command was engaged with the wounded and the held ponies. The Indians made several abortive rushes to recapture their ponies, and Strahorn reported that a number of the most gallant dashes were made at them by Lieut. Crawford at the head of ten or twelve cavalry. Observing warriors riding back and forth through the gaps in the buttes, Mills grew worried that there was another village nearby and that Crook may not arrive in time. Captain Mills gave the order to retreat, but Captain Jack told him that a retreat was impossible. Not anticipating an Indian fight, Mills had allowed his men only fifty rounds of ammunition each, and he would wait for General Crook's personal attention to Chief American Horse.

== General Crook arrives ==
General Crook's relief column endured a forced march of twenty-miles in about four hours and a half hours to reach the village and arrived at Slim Buttes at 11:30 a.m. on September 9. The whole cheering command entered the valley, and the village teemed with activity like an anthill which had just been stirred up. Crook immediately established his headquarters and set up a field hospital in one of the Indian lodges. Crook inventoried the camp and the booty. The camp held thirty-seven lodges. A three or four-year-old girl was discovered, but no bodies were found. Over 5,000 pounds of dried meat was found and was a "God-send" for the starved troopers. Troopers separated the stores to be saved from the greater number to be destroyed, and the remaining tipis were pulled down.

=== The ravine at Slim Buttes ===
Crook soon turned his efforts to dislodging Chief American Horse and his family in the ravine. The defenders had already killed Private John Wenzel, wounded others and threatened all that approached. The deaths and injuries of their comrades inflamed the soldiers who were already distraught from their ordeal. Trees and brush obstructed the view of the interior of the winding dry gully and the narrowness kept the soldiers from firing accurately. Some of the scouts and packers joined in an informal attempt to roust the Indians but met with unexpected firepower and fell back in surprise. "Crook then deployed troops below the mouth of the ravine, crawling on their bellies, firing at random into the hidden ravine without evident harm to the warriors. Before along a multitude of soldiers had gathered near the cavelike mouth of the ditch, somewhat protected from gunfire by sharp embankment. Officers and men joined sending a fusillade into its black depths, and suddenly they received a veritable volley in response that sent them reeling and stumbling away." Then, on Crook's orders, First Lieutenant William Philo Clark led a group of twenty volunteers forth, but the Indians sent forth such overwhelming volleys that the troops scampered for safety. Some of the men crept forward with flaming sticks which they tossed into the ditch without apparent effect. By now hundreds of idlers had gathered in the vicinity of the ravine and they complicated the efforts. "It was a wonder to me," recalled Major John G. Bourke, "that the shots of the beleaguered did not kill them by the half-dozen."

=== Charles "Buffalo Chips" White ===
Crook's scouts positioned themselves on the opposite side of the ravine just above the cave. The bank of the ravine was probably eight to ten feet high, and the scouts could converse with the Indians below without the danger of getting shot. After Lieutenant Clark's unsuccessful assault, Scout Charles "Buffalo Chips" White attempted to get a shot in the cave and was immediately killed by the defenders. Frank Grouard witnessed the incident:

Buffalo Chips was standing opposite me. He was one of those long-haired scouts, and claimed to be a partner of Buffalo Bill's. He thought it was a good place to make name for himself, I suppose, for he told Big Bat that he was going to have one of the Indians' scalps. He had no more than got the words out of his mouth before he yelled, "My God, I am shot." I heard this cry and looked around, Buffalo Chips was falling over into the hole where the Indians were hiding. Bat was looking into the cave where the Indians were, and about five seconds afterwards jumped out with an Indian's scalp in his hand, telling me that he had scalped one of the redskins alive, which I found out to be true. He had seen the Indian that killed Buffalo Chips, and he jumped down onto him as the Indian was reaching to get White's six-shooter. Bat had jumped right down on top of him and scalped him and got out of the cave before anybody knew what he was doing.

"Buffalo Chips" White was a boyhood friend of Col. Cody and also a scout. He wanted to be like Buffalo Bill and acquired the sobriquet "Buffalo Chips" when Gen. Phillip Sheridan said he was more like Buffalo Chips than Buffalo Bill. Major Bourke described him as a "good-natured liar who played Sancho Panza to Buffalo Bill's Don Quixote." Gen. Charles King said he was a good man.

=== Women and children ===
Crook, exasperated by the protracted defense of the hidden Sioux, and annoyed at the casualties inflicted among his men, formed a perfect cordon of infantry and dismounted cavalry around the Indian den. The soldiers opened upon it an incessant fire, which made the surrounding hills echo back a terrible music." "The circumvalleted Indians distributed their shots liberally among the crowding soldiers, but the shower of close-range bullets from the later terrified the unhappy squaws, and they began singing the awful Indian death chant. The papooses wailed so loudly, and so piteously, that even not firing could not quell their voices. General Crook ordered the men to suspend operations immediately, but dozens of angry soldiers heard this evidence that the Lakota had put women and children at risk.They surged forward and had to be beat back by officers. "Neither General Crook nor any of his officers or men suspected that any women and children were in the gully until their cries were heard above the volume of fire poured upon the fatal spot." Crook Grouard and Pourier, who spoke Lakota, were ordered by General Crook to offer the women and children quarter. This was accepted by the besieged, and Crook in person went into the mouth of the ravine and handed out one tall, fine looking woman, who had an infant strapped to her back. She trembled all over and refused to liberate the General's hand. Eleven other squaws and six papooses were taken out and crowded around Crook, but the few surviving warriors refused to surrender and savagely re-commenced the fight.

=== "Rain of Hell" ===
Chief American Horse refused to leave, and with three warriors, five women and an infant, remained in the cave. Exasperated by the increasing casualties in his ranks, Crook directed some of his infantry and dismounted cavalry to form across the opening of the gorge. On command, the troopers opened steady and withering fire on the ravine which sent an estimated 3,000 bullets among the warriors. Finerty reported,

Then our troops reopened with a very 'rain of hell' upon the infatuated braves, who, nevertheless, fought it out with Spartan courage, against such desperate odds, for nearly two hours. Such matchless bravery electrified even our enraged soldiers into a spirit of chivalry, and General Crook, recognizing the fact that the unfortunate savages had fought like fiends, in defense of wives and children, ordered another suspension of hostilities and called upon the dusky heroes to surrender.

Strahorn recalled the horror.

The yelling of Indians, discharge of guns, cursing of soldiers, crying of children, barking of dogs, the dead crowded in the bottom of the gory, slimy ditch, and the shrieks of the wounded, presented the most agonizing scene that clings in my memory of Sioux warfare.

=== Surrender of Chief American Horse ===
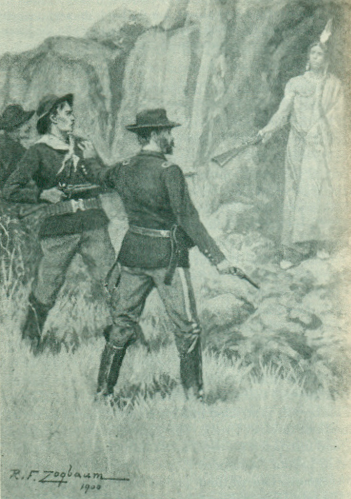
Surrender of Chief American Horse to General Crook at Slim Buttes.

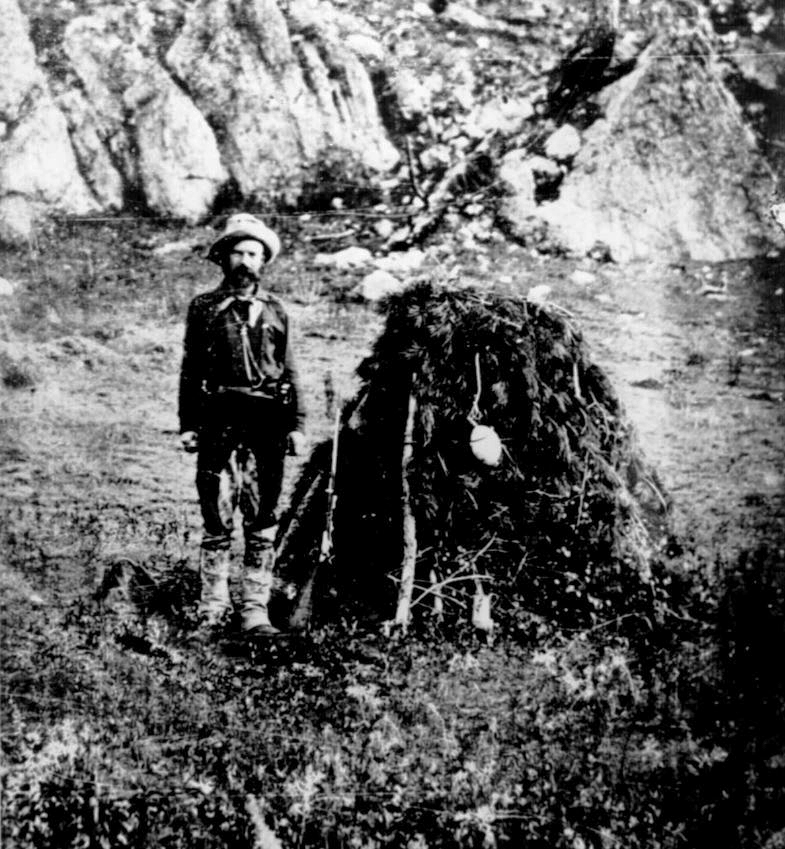
Dr. McGillycuddy at Slim Buttes. He worked in futility to save the life of Chief American Horse

When matters quieted down, Grouard and Pourier asked American Horse again if they would come out of the hole before any more were shot, telling them they would be safe if they surrendered. "After a few minutes deliberation, the chief, American Horse, a fine looking, broad-chested Sioux, with a handsome face and a neck like a bull, showed himself at the mouth of the cave, presenting the butt end of his rifle toward the General. He had just been shot in the abdomen, and said in his native language, that he would yield if the lives of the warriors who fought with him were spared. Pourier recalled that he first saw American Horse kneeling with a gun is his hand in a hole on the side of the ravine that he had scooped out with a butcher knife. Chief American Horse had been shot through the bowels and was holding his entrails in his hands as he came out. Two of the squaws were also wounded. Eleven were killed in the hole. Grouard recognized Chief American Horse, "but you would not have thought he was shot from his appearance and his looks, except for the paleness of his face. He came marching out of that death trap as straight as an arrow. Holding out one of his blood-stained hands he shook hands with me." When Chief American Horse presented the butt end of his rifle, General Crook, who took the proffered rifle, instructed Grouard to ask his name. The Indian replied in Lakota, "American Horse." Some of the soldiers, who lost their comrades in the skirmish shouted, "No quarter!', but not a man was base enough to attempt shooting down the disabled chief. Crook hesitated for a minute and then said, 'Two or three Sioux, more or less, can make no difference. I can yet use them to good advantage. "Tell the chief," he said turning to Grouard, "that neither he nor his young men will be harmed further."

This message having been interpreted to Chief American Horse, he beckoned to his surviving followers, and two strapping Indians, with their long, but quick and graceful stride, followed him out of the gully. The chieftain's intestines protruded from his wound, but a squaw, his wife perhaps, tied her shawl around the injured part, and then the poor, fearless savage, never uttering a complaint, walked slowly to a little camp fire, occupied by his people about 20 yards away, and sat down among the women and children.

Chief American Horse was examined by the two surgeons. One of them pulled the chief's hands away, and the intestines dropped out. "Tell him he will die before next morning," said the surgeon. The surgeons worked futilely to close his stomach wound, and Chief American Horse refused morphine preferring to clench a stick between his teeth to hide any sign of pain or emotions and thus he bravely and stolidly died. Chief American Horse lingered until 6:00 a.m. and confirmed that the tribes were scattering and were becoming discouraged by war. "He appeared satisfied that the lives of his squaws and children were spared." Dr. McGillicuddy, who attended the dying chief, said that he was cheerful to the last and manifested the utmost affection for his wives and children. American Horse's squaws and children were allowed to remain on the battleground after the dusky hero's death, and subsequently fell into the hands of their own people. Even "Ute John" respected the cold clay of the brave Sioux leader, and his corpse was not subjected to the scalping process." Crook was most gentle in his assurances to all of them that no further harm should come if they went along peacefully, and it only required a day or two of kind treatment to make them feel very much at home.

=== Prisoners, bodies and scalpings ===
One of the two remaining warriors from the ravine was Charging Bear, who later became a U.S. Army Indian Scout. They had 24 cartridges remaining among them, and bodies had been used as shields. Finerty wrote that "the skull of one poor squaw was blown, literally, to atoms, revealing the ridge of the palate and presenting a most ghastly and revolting spectacle. Another of the dead females was so riddled with bullets that there appeared to be no unwounded part of her person left." Crook ordered the remaining bodies removed from the cave. "Several soldiers jumped at once into the ravine and bore out the corpses of the warrior killed by Pourier and three dead squaws." "The old Indian Big Bat Pourier had killed was unceremoniously hauled up by what hair remained and a leather belt around the middle. The body had stiffened in death in the posture of an old man holding a gun, which was the way he shot. He was an old man, and his features wore a look of grim determination."

Ute John scalped all of the dead, unknown to the General or any of the officers, and I regret to state a few, a very few, brutalized soldiers followed his savage example. Each took only a portion of the scalp, but the exhibition of human depravity was nauseating. The unfortunate should have been respected, even in the coldness and nothingness of death. In that affair surely the army were the assailants and the savages acted purely in self defense.

Even "Ute John" respected the cold clay of the brave Sioux leader Chief American Horse and his corpse was not subjected to the scalping process." Captain Jack told readers of the Omaha Daily Bee that he had taken "one top-knot" during the Battle of Slim Buttes in which he "came near losing" his own hair. He later regretted the bloody deed and never spoke of it in public performances.

== Captain Jack's ride ==
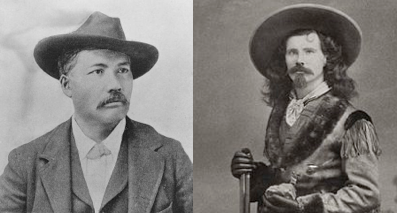
Frank Grouard and Captain Jack raced to Ft. Laramie to announce the victory at the Battle of Slim Buttes.

The Battle of Slim Buttes, fought on September 9 and 10, 1876, was first U.S. Army victory after Custer's defeat at the Battle of the Little Big Horn on June 25 and 26, 1876, in the Great Sioux War of 1876–1877. The American public was fixed on news of the defeat and embedded war correspondents from national newspapers fought alongside General Crook and reported the events.

On September 10, 1876, General Crook Crook ordered Frank Grouard, his trusted Chief Scout, to carry dispatches to Fort Laramie announcing the battle and victory at Slim Buttes. Grouard's strict orders were to see that the official dispatches were telegraphed first, then followed by the dispatches from the war correspondents. The next morning, Grouard left in company with Captain Anson Mills, Lieut. Bubb and about seventy-five mounted troopers riding ahead to the Black Hills mining camps to purchase provisions for Crook's starving command. At Crook's request, Captain Jack joined Mills's party, accompanied by war correspondents Robert E. Strahorn and Reuben Briggs Davenport. Unknown to Grouard, Davenport wanted an exclusive for the New York Herald and offered to pay Captain Jack five-hundred dollars if he could beat Grouard to the telegraph in Fort Laramie. Telegraphing news of the victory of Slim Buttes thus became a race between Frank Grouard and Captain Jack Crawford. It was a dangerous undertaking, for Indians were still harassing the mining communities, and only two days earlier, a Sioux party had come within two hundred yards of the main street in Crook City.

On the morning of September 12, 1876, a small detail galloped into Crook City, with Captain Jack leading the way and quickly purchased supplies from citizens anxious to cooperate with the army. That evening while Grouard slept, Captain Jack embarked upon a daring ride racing ahead to Deadwood in the pitch dark. The next day, when Grouard arrived in Deadwood, he learned that Captain Jack had arrived in Deadwood at 6 a.m., secured a new horse, and then headed for Custer City. Grouard quickly purchased fresh mounts and caught up with Captain Jack near Custer City.

"The animal he was riding was completely winded. I asked him as soon as I caught up with him if he had not had orders to go with Lieut. Bubb to buy supplies. He made the reply that he was taking some dispatches through for the New York Herald." Grouard told Captain Jack that "he was discharged from the time he quit the command."

They agreed to spend the night in Custer City and resume the race the next day. Grouard had changed horses six times on the road, killing three and "using three of them up so they never were any good afterwards." Upon his arrival in Custer City, he was so exhausted that he had to be taken off his horse. After handing the dispatches over to U.S. Army Couriers, Grouard wrote a note to Gen. Crook telling him what he had done and laid in bed for 3 days.

On September 16, 1876, Captain Jack reached Fort Laramie at 7:00 p.m., nine hours behind a government courier. Crawford had ridden a distance of 350 miles in six days. Still, Crawford had Davenport's dispatches on the wire five hours ahead of all other correspondents. On September 18, 1876, the New York Herald published Crawford's own story under the headline "Captain Jack's Ride as a Bearer of Herald Despatches." While, the adventure cost Captain Jack his job as a military scout, his daring ride to tell the news of the great victory at Slim Buttes made him a national celebrity. Captain Jack proudly described his feat to countless audiences in later years.

== The Old Scouts ==
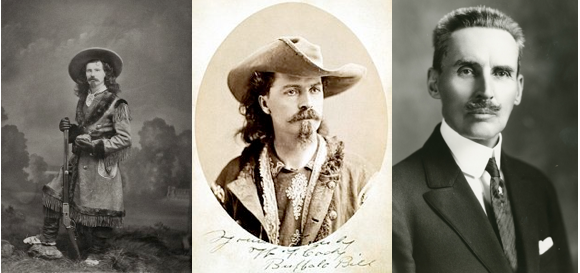
While the Old Scouts found adventure, glory and fame in the Sioux War, in later years they would not talk of it. All expressed remorse. (left to right) Captain Jack Crawford, Col. Buffalo Bill Cody and Robert Edmund Strahorn.

"Old Scouts" Robert E. Strahorn, Captain Jack Crawford and Col. Buffalo Bill Cody shaped the vision of the American West through their images and narratives. At The Wigwam, the home of their friend Major Israel McCreight ("Cante Tanke") in Du Bois, Pennsylvania, they could relax, smoke and talk about the Old West. While the Old Scouts found adventure, glory, and fame in the Great Sioux War of 1876-1877, in later years they would not talk of it. Captain Jack's race with Frank Grouard and perilous ride to tell the news of the victory at Slim Buttes made him a national celebrity. Strahorn remarked that his service in the Sioux War won him many laurels. Cody's fight with the young Cheyenne warrior Yellow Hand and “First Scalp for Custer” launched his theatrical career and played a significant role in shaping the relationship between the press and the fledgling world of show business.

=== Battle of Slim Buttes ===
The Battle of Slim Buttes and the destruction of Oglala Lakota Chief American Horse's village epitomized the excesses of U.S. Army and Indian warfare of the period. Indian villages were attacked at dawn, sacked and burned. Warriors were killed, captured and dispersed; food, lodges and supplies destroyed; ponies seized or killed; and many women and children killed in the confusion. The major military objective was to hit Indian commissaries and starve them into submission. "Humanistically speaking, the tactic was immoral, but for an army charged with subjugating the Sioux and other dissident Plains tribes, it was justified for the simple reason that it worked."

While the Old Scouts found adventure, glory and fame in the Sioux War, in later years they would not talk of it. Captain Jack and Strahorn were with General George Crook at the Battle of Slim Buttes and expressed remorse. Crawford declined to give any details of his observations at Slim Buttes. He said it was something he neither wanted to discuss or hear of; he said it hurt him even to have to think about it. Captain Jack said he had taken "one top-knot" at the Battle of Slim Buttes during a fight in which he "came near losing" his own hair. He later regretted his bloody deed and never spoke of it in his public performances

Strahorn was always reticent when attempts were made to get him to relate his experiences while with Crook's army. Like Crawford, he wished that the Slim Buttes affair could be stricken from the historical records; it was too painful for him to talk of it at all. Strahorn later recalled Chief American Horse and the ravine at Slim Buttes.

The yelling of Indians, discharge of guns, cursing of soldiers, crying of children, barking of dogs, the dead crowded in the bottom of the gory, slimy ditch, and the shrieks of the wounded, presented the most agonizing scene that clings in my memory of Sioux warfare.

Buffalo Bill would not discuss the killing of Chief American Horse at Slim Buttes. He just shook his head and said it was too bad to talk about. While Cody did not participate in the Battle of Slim Buttes, he took a scalp at the Battle of Warbonnet Creek on July 17, 1876, in a skirmish characterized as duel between Buffalo Bill and a young Cheyenne warrior Yellow Hair. The engagement, often referred to as the "First Scalp for Custer", was dramatized with Captain Jack in their consolidated theater act. Buffalo Bill displayed the fallen warrior's scalp, feather war bonnet, knife, saddle and other personal effects. However, scalping Indians become loathsome to Buffalo Bill.

== Col. Buffalo Bill Cody ==
Captain Jack and Buffalo Bill met during the Great Sioux War. In 1876, Crawford left the Black Hills to join Cody on the stage. On January 8, 1877, the Buffalo Bill Combination thrilled a large audience at Boston's Beethoven Hall. The occasion was its performance of the sensational melodrama, 'The Red Right Hand' or 'Buffalo Bill's First Scalp for Custer', loosely based on William F. Cody's exploits as a military scout. The Boston press commented favorably on Captain Jack Crawford's appearance in a leading role, as did newspapers in other towns where the combination performed. Nearly all the stories also described Crawford's "perilous journey" following the Slim Buttes engagement, and nearly all misrepresented the facts by exaggerating the distance of his ride or the amount of money he had received from the New York Herald. In the summer of 1877, the stage partnership ended on a sour note in Virginia City, Nevada. In a horseback combat scene staged with Buffalo Bill, Captain Jack initially reported he accidentally shot himself in the groin during a performance, but later blamed Cody's drunken condition for the incident. He was confined to bed for more than two weeks.

Cody and Crawford were much alike, and their talents were compared by audiences and themselves. They were sincere friends, but had a rocky relationship. Both were noted for their good fellowship, sunny dispositions, generosity, optimism, and willingness to undergo hardships to achieve their goals. Each had gone to work at a young age to help support his family, thereby neglecting a formal education. Like Crawford, Cody frequently left his wife and children for extended periods. In fact, when Cody's five-year-old son Kit Carson Cody was fatally stricken with scarlet fever in April 1876, Cody was on tour in the East. The death of "Kitty" gives the first documented evidence of the Cody-Crawford friendship, for Cody notified Crawford (then in the Black Hills) of the little boy's death, and Crawford responded with a poem, which began, "My friend, I feel your sorrow, just as though it were my own."'

== Apache War in New Mexico ==
In 1879, Jack relocated his family from Pennsylvania to the New Mexico territory and began scouting for the army again, this time in their war against the Apache nation. He also became a post-trader at Fort Craig New Mexico and engaged in ranching and mining. Crawford served as a U.S. Army scout in New Mexico during Victorio's War of 1880, when he and two companions rode deep into Mexico to locate the camp of the dynamic Warm Springs Apache leader Victorio, then waging war against inhabitants of Texas, New Mexico, and Chihuahua, Mexico. Following Victorio's War, Crawford became post trader at Fort Craig, New Mexico, where he established a home for his family and engaged in ranching and mining in nearby hills. Even after the post closed in 1885, the Crawfords remained on the abandoned military reservation, serving as custodians.

== Indians ==
Captain Jack, like most army officers, looked upon reservations as temporary reserves where Indians would begin to learn about civilisation and the American way of life. He believed that Indians were capable of great change and that private land ownership would lead to their ultimate assimilation into American society. Captain Jack also believed Native Americans would observe modern life and different cultures, acquire new skills and customs, and change at their own pace and terms. Crawford was angry with the Indians about Custer and the Little Big Horn, and his early performances and poems show the Indian as a dangerous (but worthy) opponent.

His later performances and poems are more sympathetic, and focus on shared universal emotions with whites. Crawford held progressive views of Indians, including the sanctioning of interracial marriages, which he depicted in poetry and short stories. Captain Jack promoted Indian education and opposed off-reservation boarding schools. He believed that education should be provided close to home "under the eyes of the parents, who must thereby learn to respect education. "He had witnessed "a child torn from his screaming mother's arms and hurried away" and asked a reporter, "Don't you suppose that mother has the same feeling in her breast for her young as your mother had for you?"

In 1889, Crawford served as special agent for the U.S. Justice Department of Justice, spending the next four years investigating illegal liquor traffic and fighting alcoholism on Indian reservations in the western states and territories.

== Poet and entertainer ==
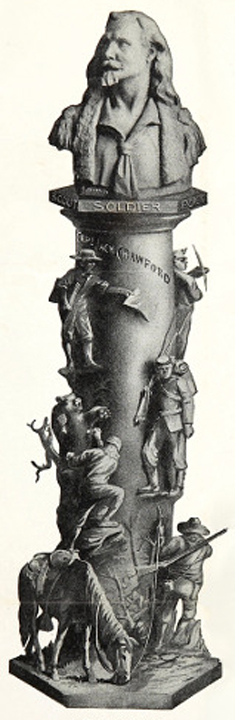
Captain Jack, Poet Scout (1904-1905), bronze bust & pedestal by August Zeller.

From 1893 to 1898, Crawford built a national reputation as an entertainer known as the "Poet Scout." Captain Jack was a popular speaker and performer in music halls and stages all over the U.S. lecturing on the West, the Sioux Wars and encouraging his audiences to forswear liquor. Sometimes he spoke before audiences that numbered a thousand or more. On occasion, he gave three performances in a single day before boarding a train for the next day's engagement. Captain Jack was one of many professional speakers to benefit from the long-entrenched American habit of listening to lectures for amusement and enrichment. Americans in the 1890s continued their quest for self-education, and thousands flocked to Chautauqua grounds in the summer and filled local lecture halls throughout the year. Jack crisscrossed the nation speaking to Chautauquas, veteran's organizations, schoolchildren, college students, reformatory inmates, private clubs, railroad employees, schoolteachers, YMCA boys, and middle-class Americans in general. Captain Jack's manner of dress, charm and gift of poetry made him a popular American celebrity. He stepped on stage dressed in buckskin wearing a wide-brimmed sombrero covering his shoulder-length curly hair. With a Winchester rifle in hand and a six-shooter at his waist, Captain Jack was of the mythical hero of the American Wild West. Captain Jack's performances were a "frontier monologue and medley" that, as one New York City journalist reported, "held his audience spell-bound for two hours by a simple narration of his life." His performances reinforced a positive view of the West as a land of adventure, opportunity, freedom, and individualism, where civilization ultimately triumphed over savagery. Crawford blamed dime novels for leading many young men into a life of crime, poverty, and dissipation. He blamed their influence for some of the tragedies he had witnessed during the Black Hills gold rush; youngsters lured west by adventure stories only to die from exposure or in brushes with the Sioux.

== Adventurer ==
"Crawford's experiences in the Black Hills, covering no more than eighteen months, dramatically affected his later career and taught him some valuable lessons. He learned the fundamentals of gold mining, for example, and discovered that investment funds were essential for development. For the rest of his life, he retained a consuming interest in mining, working hard to interest capitalists in his mining schemes." In spring of 1878, journeyed to the gold fields of the Cariboo Region in British Columbia.

== Books and poems ==
Crawford was a prolific writer and published seven books of poetry, wrote more than one hundred short stories and copyrighted four plays. Captain Jack's written accounts of life on the frontier are noted for their true representation of the real dangers of harsh pioneer life. Many of Captain Jack's books and poems are still performed and recorded as songs, such as "The Death of Custer", "Rattlin' Joe's Prayer" (which became the basis, reset as narrated by a soldier, of the song "The Deck of Cards") where a miner preaches a sermon from playing cards, and "California Joe and the Girl Trapper". His poem "Only a Miner Killed" has been cited as the basis for Bob Dylan's song "Only a Hobo".

== U.S. Department of Justice ==
In 1889, Crawford accepted an appointment as special agent for the U.S. Justice Department of Justice, spending the next four years investigating illegal liquor traffic and fighting alcoholism on Indian reservations in the western states and territories.

== Final years ==
From 1898 to 1900, Captain Jack spent the next two years in the Klondike, fruitlessly searching for gold. Upon his return to the United States, he rejoined the lecture circuit, and for the next decade he traveled throughout the country staging entertainments. When Crawford died in 1917, newspapers across the nation reported on the event, one writer paying tribute in these words: "[Crawford] was a real scout, and a real poet —a man with a warrior's soul and the heart of a woman." In later life Jack separated from his family and moved back east, settling in Woodhaven, Long Island, New York. He died of Bright's disease on February 27, 1917.
