= Horsemeat March =

1876 military expedition during the Great Sioux War

The Horsemeat March of 1876, also known as the Mud March and the Starvation March, was a military expedition led by General George Crook in pursuit of a band of Sioux fleeing from anticipated retaliation for their overwhelming victory over George Armstrong Custer's 7th Cavalry Regiment at the Battle of the Little Bighorn. Poorly rationed and hampered by muddy conditions, the soldiers eventually had to butcher and eat their horses and mules as they became lame or injured. The Horsemeat March ended with the Battle of Slim Buttes and the capture and looting of American Horse the Elder's richly stocked village.

== Background ==
Disputes over the Black Hills of the Dakota Territory came to a high during the Great Sioux War of 1876 between the U.S. Army and the many Native American groups in the area (Lakota, Sioux, Arapaho and Northern Cheyenne). After the Battle of Powder River in March, organized by General Crook and led by Colonel Joseph J. Reynolds, a larger effort was made for a battle later in the spring in order to move the Natives to reservations. Multiple columns of soldiers were made to trap the enemy and prevent escaping. Crook's command, the 2nd and 3rd Cavalries and 4th and 9th Infantries, moved north from Fort Fetterman for the battle. However, they encountered the Sioux and Cheyenne, resulting in the Battle of the Rosebud, which delayed them to the columns in Dakota. The subsequent Battle of the Little Bighorn went on without them.

The intention of the Army's senior commanders was to reunite their soldiers with Custer's in order to finally win the battle by overwhelming the native camps. On June 22, 1876, Custer declined the offer of reinforcements in either soldiers or equipment. On June 24, Custer's troops found shelter on an overlook called Crow's Nest, about fourteen miles east of the Little Bighorn River; from here they spotted a herd of ponies. This overlook afforded them a view of one of the largest gatherings of Native Americans on the Great Plains ever recorded at the time. The gathering had been called together by Hunkpapa Lakota religious leader Sitting Bull and consisted of approximately 1800 men, including such notable warriors as Crazy Horse and Gall. Custer moved forward under false information given by agents that suggested the region had just over 800 warriors, roughly the same size as the 7th Cavalry.

Custer and the men under his command took up positions on a hill near the native encampment known as Battle Ridge. Under the leadership of Crazy Horse, the native warriors decimated Custer's soldiers, forcing a small remnant of his command to defend themselves at a spot now known as Last Stand Hill. Custer and his men were massacred by the combined Sioux and Cheyenne force in what has become known as one of the worst defeats in American military history. Following the battle, the United States increased the size of its army and began a campaign to chase the large force of native warriors that had succeeded against Custer.

== The Horsemeat March ==
Following the Battle of the Little Bighorn, most of the native warriors fled the area and were not pursued for nearly two months. The U.S. Army spent much of those two months trying to recruit and train a force capable of fighting the tribes. General George Crook, who commanded over one thousand cavalry and infantry soldiers together with numerous Native American scouts, eventually took the helm of a punitive military campaign against the Sioux. Despite an extreme shortage of rations for his troops, Crook pushed forward to the Black Hills. The resulting march, variably known as the "Mud March" because of the conditions created by heavy rainfall at the time, and also the "Starvation March" because of the lack of food and supplies, is most commonly labeled the "Horsemeat March" because of the particular food on which the troops subsisted: their own horses.

=== Dr. Clements' Diary ===
Bennett A. Clements was a surgeon in the United States Army who, by the late 1860s, had achieved the rank of lieutenant colonel. In December 1876, Dr. Clements filed a report on General Crook's campaign against the Sioux, detailing the Horsemeat March and the Battle of Slim Buttes. His report, which takes the form of a daily diary of the campaign, describes a difficult time of near-starvation. One entry, on August 31, 1876, illustrates the intense difficulties encountered by Crook's troops:

Long marches in the most frequent of rain-storms, with cold nights and heavy dews, and the prospect of achieving satisfactory results, always so encouraging to the soldier, was not apparent. There were about five-and-a-half days' rations of coffee, and less than two days of bread and salt left; the distance to the Black Hills was definitely not known, and the Ree Indian scouts, who alone knew anything of the intervening country, left us at this point to carry dispatches to Fort Lincoln. Under these unfavorable conditions the command moved from its camp directly south on the morning of September 6, and marched 30 miles over a broken, rolling country, and camped on alkaline water holes, without enough wood to even boil coffee with. On the 7th we again made 30 miles over the same kind of country, and had an equally bad camp. All the litters, nine in number, were in use this day; many horses were abandoned, and men continued to struggle into camp until 10 P.M. On this day the men began to kill abandoned horses for food. The sick and exhausted men of the infantry were carried on pack mules, whose loads were now used up, but only a small part of those applying could be so carried.

Dr. Clements' report describes an exhausting trek through the badlands of the Dakota Territory, which became lakes of mud in the stormy weather that accompanied the journey. Before the march ended, many of the soldiers were sick and wounded, while others were forced to dismount from their horses and to walk through the mud in order for the horses to be eaten. It was a dismal follow-up to the disastrous Battle of the Little Bighorn, with General Crook, who had been considered the most talented general in the U.S. Army, losing a large proportion of his force to starvation and disease.

== Battle of Slim Buttes ==
By September 8, the troops were living off the meat from the cavalry's horses. Crook sent ahead a request for a train to bring supplies into Deadwood, a mining town in the Black Hills, and a small group of troops to pick up the supplies and carry them back to his column. On the way there, the troops discovered the Lakota tribe, in particular, an encampment of Oglala men, women, and children near Slim Buttes, in present-day South Dakota.

At dawn on September 9, roughly 150 men led by Captain Anson Mills attacked the Oglala encampment, though the Natives fought back fiercely. The Battle of Slim Buttes quickly spiraled into one of the largest battles on the Northern Plains since the Battle of the Little Bighorn itself. Crook arrived with the rest of his forces the next day, but the Oglala camp was still much larger. Ultimately, Crook's forces captured an enormous supply of dried meat that the Oglala had stockpiled to last them through the winter, and captured or killed 37 Oglala warriors. On September 13, 1876, the Horsemeat March ended when Crook's troops came in contact with the train carrying their supplies. The U.S. Army did eventually find the Lakota, but the troops were too worn out to go in pursuit of them.
