= August Zeller =

American sculptor and teacher (1863–1918)

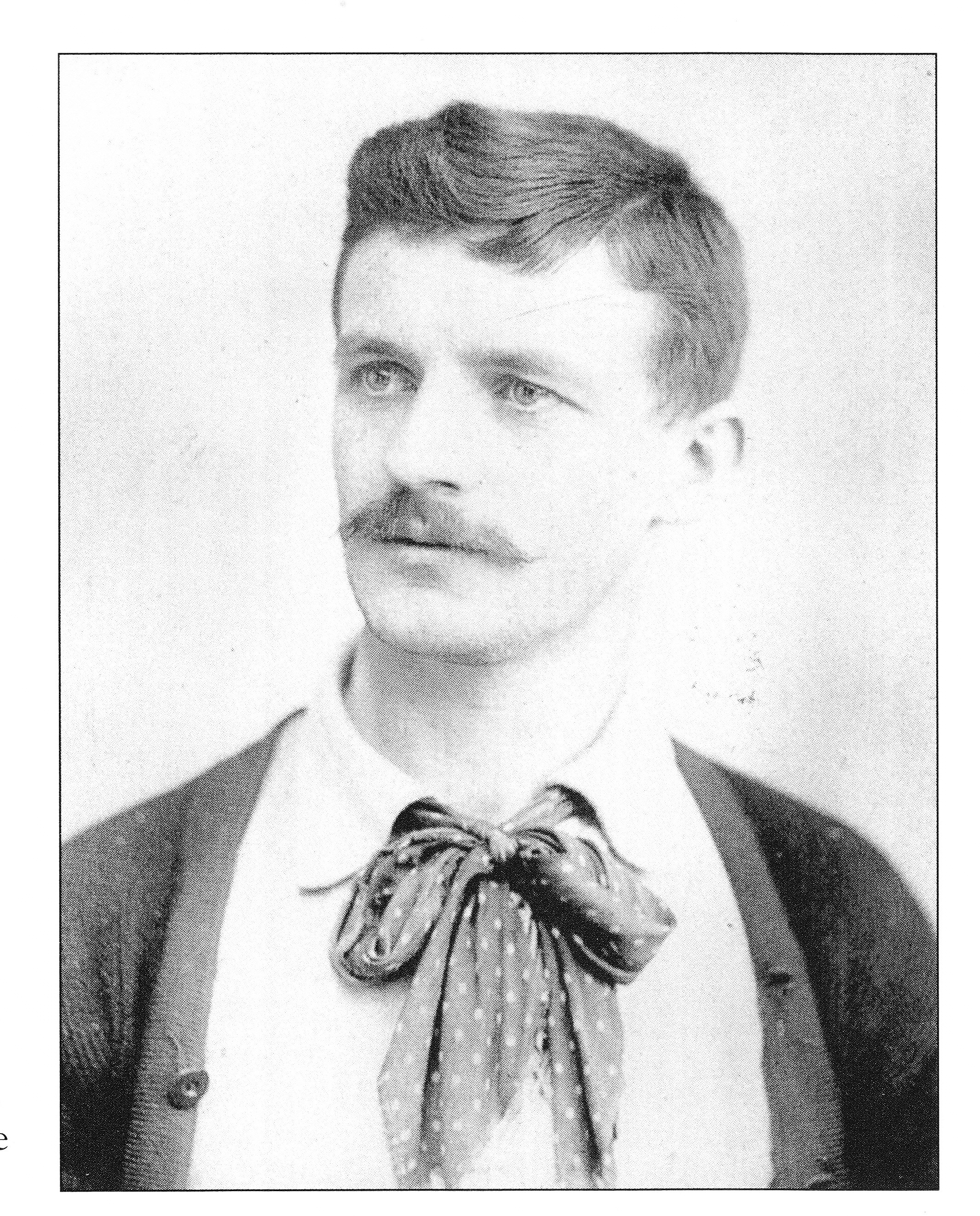
- Zeller in his 20s.
- Born: March 7, 1863; Bordentown, New Jersey, US
- Died: January 11, 1918 (aged 54); Pittsburgh, Pennsylvania, US
- Occupations: Sculptor, Teacher
- Years active: 1882 - 1918
- Known for: Sculpture student of Thomas Eakins student of Auguste Rodin
- Notable work: Slaughter of the Innocents; 96th Pennsylvania Infantry Monument, Gettysburg, PA; Soldiers' and Sailors' Monument, Pottsville, PA
- Spouse: Louise Gerber (1871 - 1953)

Signature
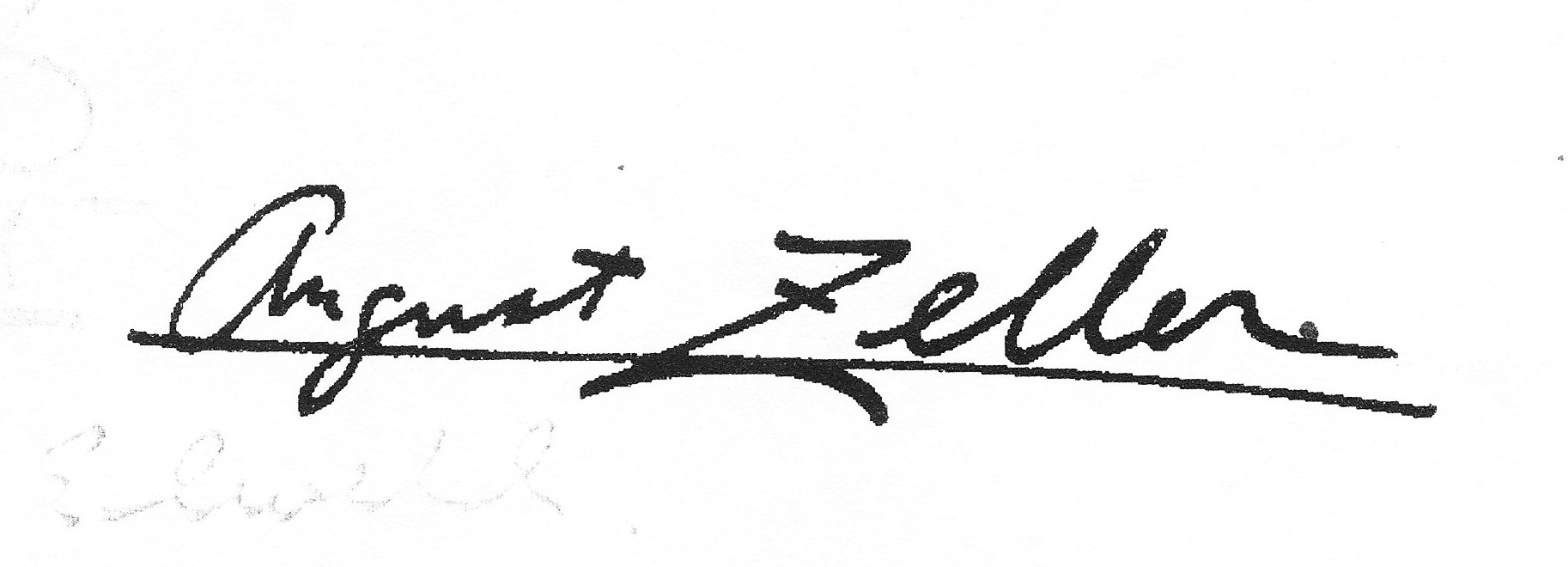

August Zeller (7 March 1863, Bordentown, New Jersey – 11 January 1918, Pittsburgh, Pennsylvania) was an American sculptor and teacher.

An exceptional carver, he studied at the Pennsylvania Academy of the Fine Arts (PAFA) under Thomas Eakins. He moved to Paris in 1890 to study at the Ecole des Beaux Arts, and studied further in the studio of Auguste Rodin.

His most prominent commissions were for two Civil War monuments: the 96th Pennsylvania Infantry Monument (1888), on the Gettysburg Battlefield; and the Schuylkill County Soldiers' and Sailors' Monument (1891), in Pottsville, Pennsylvania.

Zeller spent his final years in Pittsburgh, Pennsylvania, as curator of sculpture at the Carnegie Institute of Fine Arts and as an instructor at the Carnegie Institute of Technology.

== Biography ==
=== Early years ===
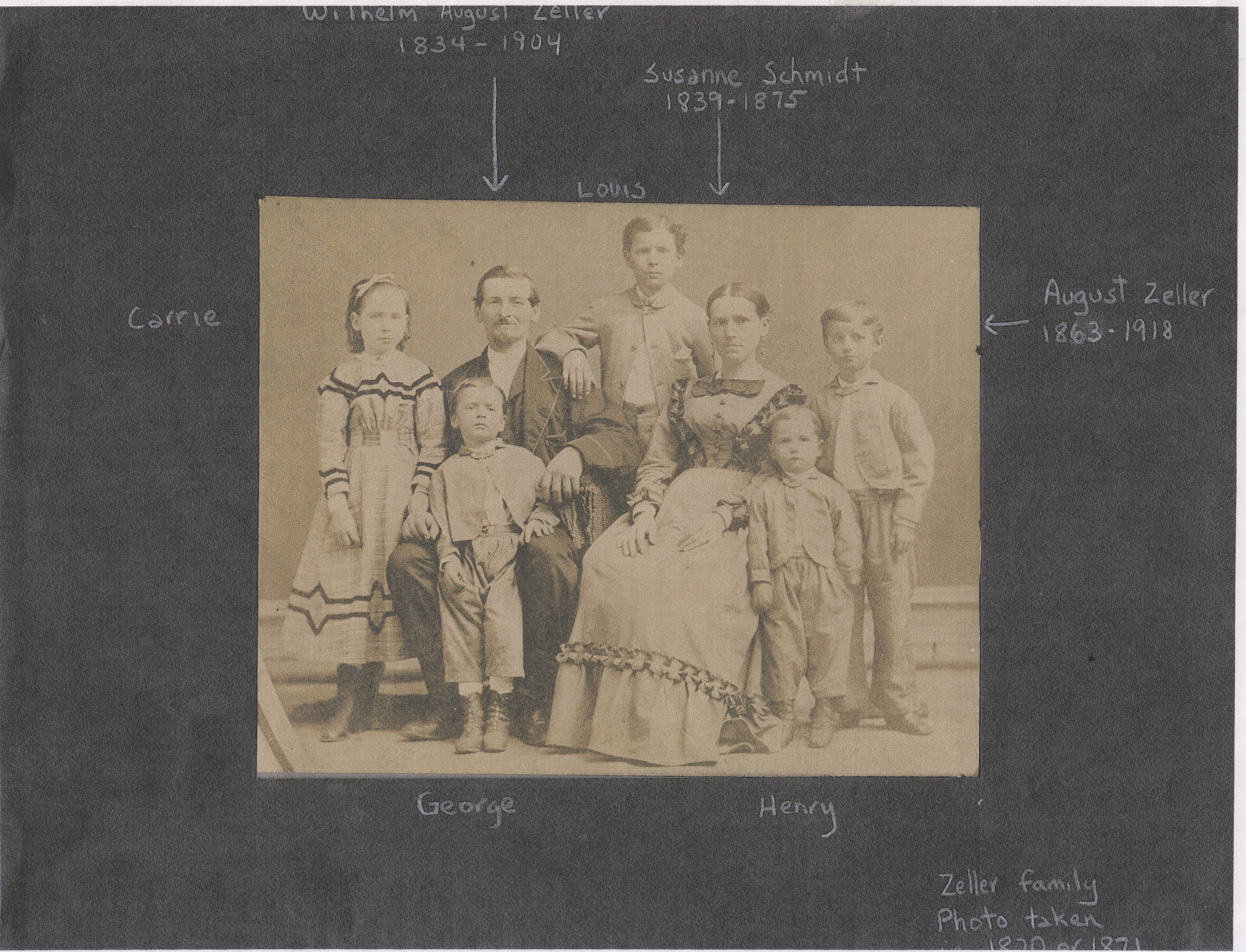
Zeller at age 7–8 (far right) in a c.1870 family portrait

Zeller was born in Bordentown, New Jersey, where his father, Wilhelm August Zeller (1834–1904), was a local merchant. Zeller may have inherited his artistic abilities from his mother, Susanne Schmidt Zeller (1839–1875), whose father had been a well-known wood carver in Kaiserslautern, Germany.

The family moved from Bordentown to neighboring Fieldsboro, when Zeller was four years old. His father opened a general store, tended a large community garden across the street from the store, and became the town's postmaster in 1880.

Zeller's mother died when he was 12 years old, leaving his father alone to support and raise a large family. At age 14, Zeller left home to apprentice at Struther's Monument Works in Philadelphia. During these years he received artistic instruction through night classes taught at the Franklin Institute.

At age 19, Zeller obtained a block of Carrara marble and began carving a monument for his mother's grave. Working in the shed behind his father's store, the sculpture took him two years to complete. The Slaughter of the Innocents depicted a Judean mother cradling her infant son, and was a posthumous life-size seated portrait of Zeller's mother. The title referenced the massacre of infant boys carried out under King Herod's orders, after he was told of Christ's birth. The sculpture was exhibited at the National Academy of Design in New York City in 1884:

Mr. August Zeller's group in marble of a mother and child, representing 'The Slaughter of the Innocents'—a work which, with faults inseparable from unsophisticated youth, displays true feeling, unwearying industry, and a serious aim. And—so true is it that when a man makes his meaning perceptible, even if only to a few, he must already have considerable technical skill—the head and raised arm of the principal figure in this group might do credit to more than one sculptor of national reputation.

The National Academy awarded Zeller a $5000 traveling prize, but he did not accept it, since one of the award's provisions was that he study art in Italy, a course he preferred not to pursue.

=== Philadelphia (1882–1887) ===
From 1882 to 1886, Zeller studied at the Pennsylvania Academy of the Fine Arts (PAFA) in Philadelphia under Thomas Eakins. Eakins was a PAFA alumnus who had studied at the École des Beaux-Arts. He returned to become director of PAFA's school, which he remodeled after the École. Eakin's teaching philosophy involved teaching by example and letting students find their own way with only terse guidance: "A teacher can do very little for a pupil & should only be thankful if he don't hinder him & the greater the master, mostly the less he can say."

In early February 1886, Eakins was forced to resign over a controversy that had erupted a month earlier—his use of a fully-nude male model before a class with female students. All 55 of the male PAFA students signed a petition threatening to withdraw from the school if Eakins was not reinstated. The petition was ignored by PAFA's Board, and only 15 of those students, including Zeller, actually withdrew. They formed their own school, the student-run Art Students' League of Philadelphia, where Eakins taught classes without pay. The school was always on shaky financial footing, and was forced to move several times before being disbanded in 1893. Zeller attended for just over a year, before moving to Pottsville.

=== Pottsville (1887–1890) ===
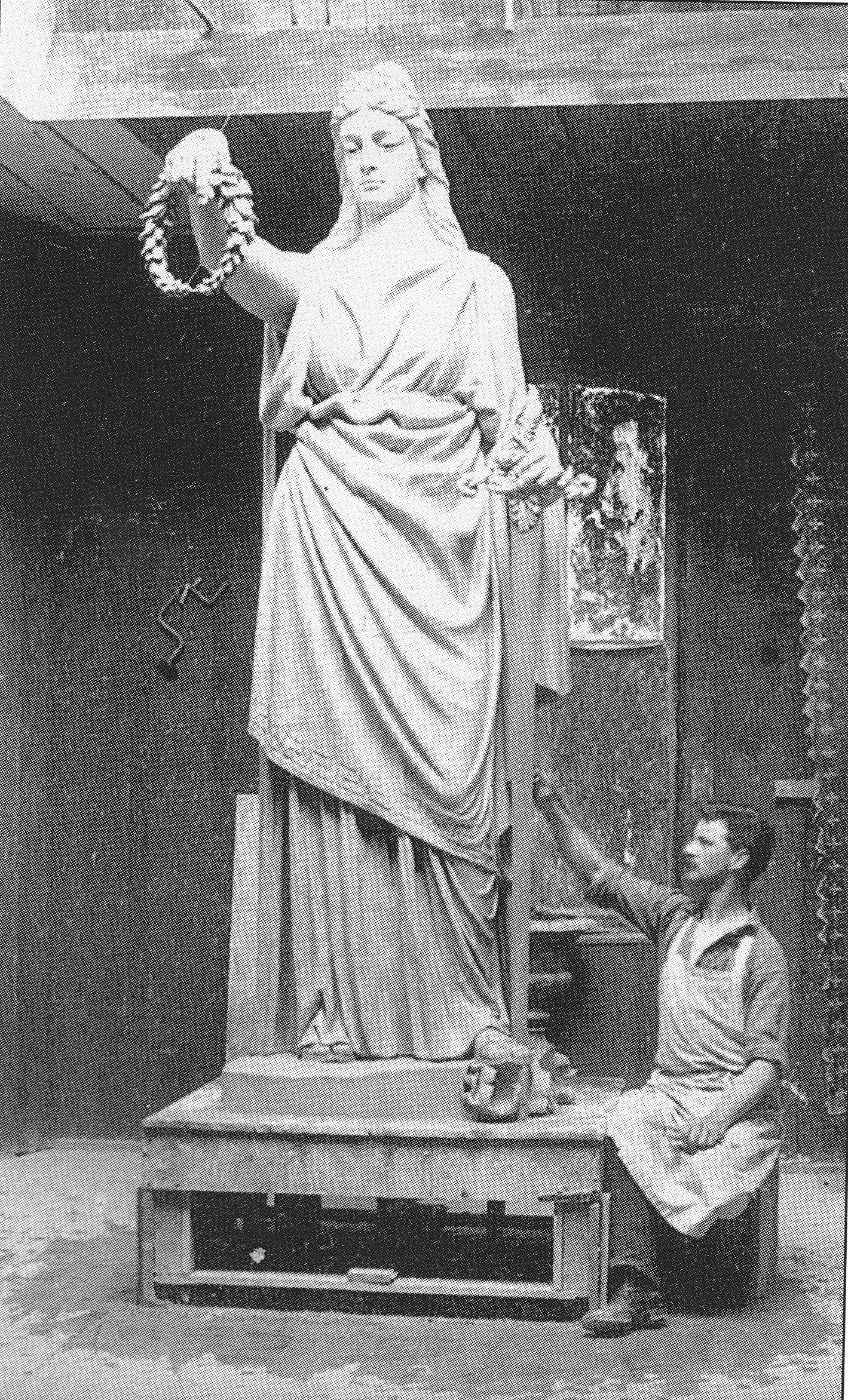
Zeller modeling The Genius of Liberty, c.1890, for the Pottsville monument.

Zeller lived and worked in Pottsville, Pennsylvania, from June 1887 to September 1890. He moved there after winning the commission to create the 96th Pennsylvania Infantry Regiment Monument for the Gettysburg battlefield.

August Zeller, the young Bordentown sculptor, is the successful competitor of a score or more who submitted designs for a memorial granite monument to be erected on the battlefield at Gettysburg by the 92d [sic 96th] Pennsylvania Volunteers. The accepted design represents a soldier lying at full length on the ground, with head raised and musket levelled.

The monument was installed in the Wheatfield, at a position the regiment had defended on July 2, 1863. The monument was unveiled and dedicated on June 21, 1888. Colonel Henry Royer gave an address at its dedication: "We are here to unveil the beautiful stone which marks the spot where our regiment fought twenty-five years ago. The monument, the artistic merit of which reflects great credit upon the young artist who designed it, bears upon its face the history of our organization."

Based on his successful work on the Gettysburg monument, Zeller was commissioned to design the Schuylkill County Soldiers' and Sailors' Monument in Pottsville. The monument took two years to complete, and required five larger-than-live figures to be cast in bronze, and an estimated 100 tons of granite to be dressed. On October 1, 1890 (Monument Day), with thousands of people in attendance to watch the parade and unveiling ceremonies, the Soldiers' and Sailors' Monument was dedicated in Garfield Square. Zeller was unable to attend the ceremonies; he was aboard a ship at sea, on his way to study in France.

=== Paris (1890–1894) ===
From November 1890 to September 1894, Zeller studied and worked in Paris, France. He began his studies at the École des Beaux-Arts, becoming active in the American Students' Art Association. While there, he studied with Gabriel-Jules Thomas, Alexandre Falguiere, and Jules Dalou.

Six months later, in May 1891, Zeller left the École des Beaux Arts and began working as a student and praticien sculptor in the studio of Auguste Rodin. After showing Rodin photos of his work, Rodin told him "to start the next Monday morning." Zeller worked for Rodin for the next two years. He worked 10- to 12-hour days, 6–7 days per week and had worked on 8 statues, including a marble statue of "Eve" by Summer 1892.

On October 22, 1892, Zeller married his housekeeper, Louise Gerber, in a civil ceremony at the Palace of Versailles with Rodin in attendance as a witness.

In May or June 1893, Zeller left the employ of Auguste Rodin after working for him for 2 years and 5 days. He had become frustrated with the long hours and the fact that he didn't receive any credit for the work he had done for Rodin. This was not unusual for the times, but clashed with Zeller's artistic desires to express his independence. Zeller considered it an honor to have worked in one of the finest studios in the world but felt the need to move on.

After leaving the employ of Rodin, Zeller worked for the French Cultural Society at the Palace of Versailles. He was engaged to sculpt a large statue there (it is not known which one), He also was charged with doing some restorative work on existing statues, including a statue of Hygeia (the goddess of medicine).

In September 1894, with his wife Louise Gerber Zeller and their baby daughter Suzanne, Zeller sailed from Southampton, England to the United States aboard the steamship SS City of Berlin. They arrived at Ellis Island, New York City, on 1 October 1894.

=== Philadelphia (1894–1905) ===
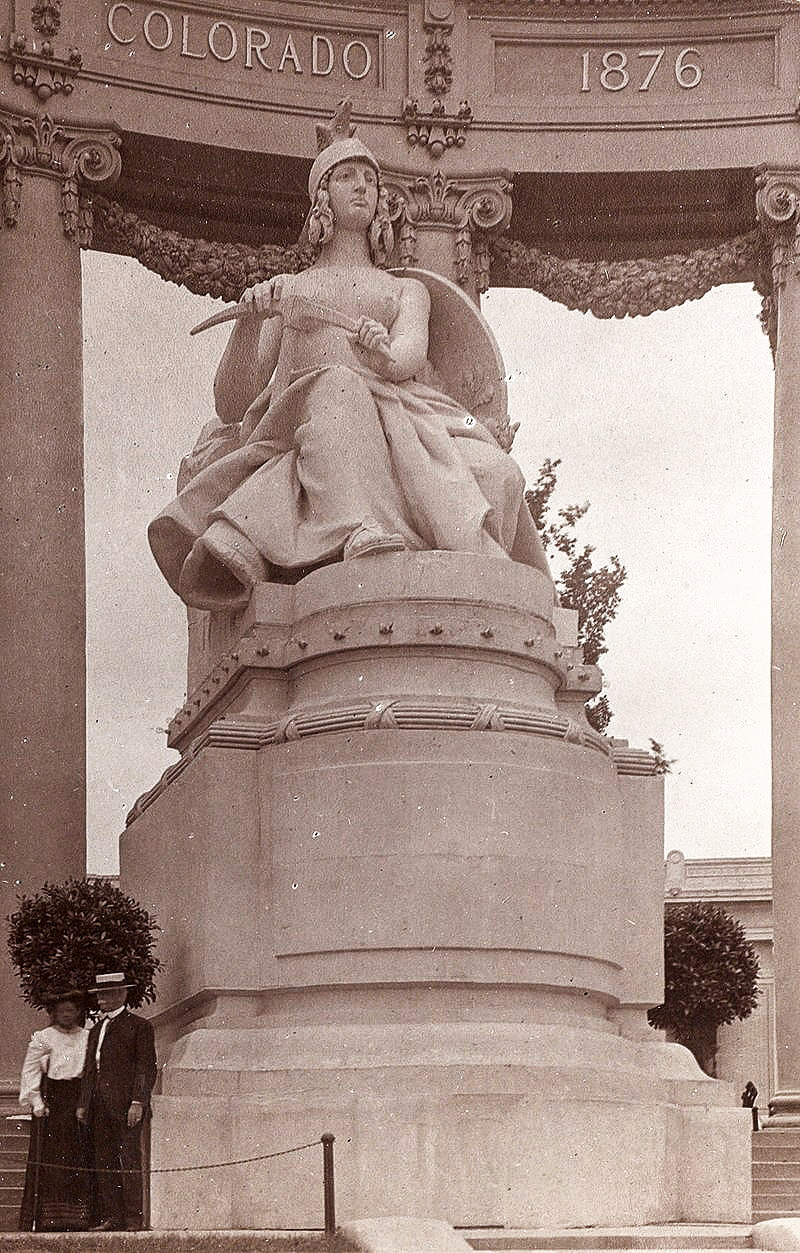
Allegorical Figure of Colorado, 1904 World's Fair, St. Louis.

Following his arrival in the United States, Zeller spent several months in Washington D.C. working on the then-under-construction Library of Congress Building. What specific work he did on the library is not known.

Returning to Philadelphia, Zeller taught at the Spring Garden Institute from 1895 through 1899. The school was known for its combining of vocational training with the fundamentals of a classical education.

In 1897 Zeller won the competition to create a bust of Judge Joseph Allison, which was installed in the Philadelphia Court of Common Pleas Building.

In 1898–1899 Zeller created "The Last Supper," a white marble high-bas relief over the altar of Holy Nativity Episcopal Church, in Rockledge, Pennsylvania. This was a collaboration with Edward Maene, who created the limestone reredos surrounding Zeller's relief.

Architects Cope and Stewardson gave Maene the contract for the architectural sculpture of the Quadrangle Dormitories at the University of Pennsylvania. Over the summer of 1900, Henry F. Plasschaert modeled in clay, and Zeller, Edmund T. Wright and William John Kaufmann carved in limestone, the 69 bosses (humorous grotesques) along the second story of the Upper Quad.

Karl Bitter was director of sculpture for the 1901 Pan-American Exposition in Buffalo, New York. Zeller was in charge of the team of sculptors who executed Bitter's designs.

Bitter also directed the sculptural program for the 1904 World's Fair in St. Louis, Missouri. Zeller designed and modeled in staff the allegorical figure Colorado, one of fourteen colossal sculptures in the Colonnade of States, each representing a state that had been part of the Louisiana Purchase.

That same year, Zeller modeled in clay a bust of the popular entertainer and folk hero "Captain Jack" Crawford.

[S]culptor August Zeller completed a clay bust of Captain Jack, which was then cast in bronze. The finished bust was mounted on a tall pedestal, bedecked with small figures depicting Crawford's life in the West. Crawford and Zeller were both delighted with the sculpture, with Zeller writing to Jack: "It has even surpassed my highest expectations." Thereafter, the Poet Scout often pictured the bust in his publicity brochures.

=== Carnegie (Pittsburgh) (1905–1918) ===
Zeller accepted the position of Curator of Sculpture at the Carnegie Institute (now the Carnegie Museum of Art) in 1905, and moved his family to Pittsburgh, Pennsylvania. In September 1907, he became a faculty member at the Carnegie Technical Schools (now Carnegie Mellon University), teaching in the School of Applied Design, and then as an assistant professor of architectural sculpture.

He continued to create a limited number of pieces over these years; and assisted sculptor Francis Edwin Elwell, former curator of the Metropolitan Museum of Art, on a number of works.

Zeller produced 2 vases for the garden of the Pennsylvania Building at the 1915 Panama–Pacific International Exposition, in San Francisco.

=== Personal ===
Zeller married Louise Gerber (1871–1953), his Parisian housekeeper, in France, in October 1892. They had two children: Suzanne Henriette Zeller (1893–1953), born in Paris; and Marcel August Zeller (1896-1972), born in Philadelphia.

Zeller died at age 54, at his home at 411 Lloyd Street, Pittsburgh. The cause of death was listed as chronic myocarditis. From the Carnegie student newspaper: "Professor Zeller was one of the oldest members of the faculty, and universally well known and liked. His death came unexpectedly and was a blow to the whole school, which united in mourning for him." Friend and fellow Carnegie faculty member, Haniel Long, a 29-year old poet and writer, read his newly composed poem "To a Dead Sculptor" at Zeller's memorial service.

Zeller was buried next to his mother and father at the Bordentown Cemetery. The following year, his Slaughter of the Innocents was installed at the gravesite.

His widow, Louise G. Zeller, was living in St. Louis, Missouri with their son (a widower) and his two children, at the time of the 1940 Census.

== Major works ==
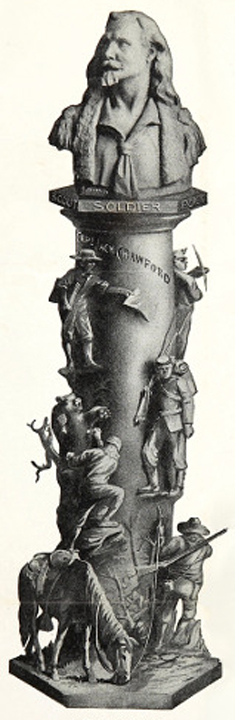
Captain Jack, Poet Scout (1904-1905), bronze bust & pedestal

- Slaughter of the Innocents (1884), white Carrara marble, height: 44.5 in (113 cm), St. Louis University Museum of Art. Exhibited at the National Academy of Design, 1884. Exhibited at the Pennsylvania Academy of the Fine Arts, 1885. Installed on Zeller family grave, Bordentown Cemetery, Bordentown, New Jersey, 1918. Removed 1970s, due to vandalism. Donated by Zeller's great-grandson to the St. Louis University Museum of Art, 2004.
- Sherman's March through Georgia (1887), bronze, location unknown
- Edith (1888), marble, private collection. Bust of a young girl in a lace dress.
- 96th Pennsylvania Infantry Monument (1888), granite, height: 66 in (170 cm), Gettysburg Battlefield, Gettysburg, Pennsylvania. Located near Little Round Top, on the north side of Wheatfield Road, east of Crawford Avenue.
- Bust of Benjamin W. Cummings (1889), marble, location unknown. Bust of a prominent Pottsville attorney.
- Schuylkill County Soldiers' and Sailors' Monument (1891), granite with bronze sculpture, height of base & pedestal: 18 ft (5.5 m), height of Genius of Liberty: 108 in (270 cm), Garfield Square, Pottsville, Pennsylvania. The monument features a tall granite Corinthian column flanked by 4 bronze soldier and sailor figures upon its stepped base, and topped by a bronze goddess figure: "The Genius of Liberty."
- Bust of Judge Joseph Allison (1897), white Carrara marble, height: 22 in (56 cm), Philadelphia Bar Association collection. Allison was a judge of the Philadelphia Court of Common Pleas from 1851 to 1875.
- The Last Supper (1899), white Carrara marble, high-bas relief over the altar, Holy Nativity Episcopal Church, Rockledge, Pennsylvania
- Colorado Monument (1904), staff, height: 20 ft (6.1 m), located in the Colonnade of States at the 1904 St. Louis World's Fair. Like all similar works, the statue was destroyed after the fair ended.
- Bust of Captain Jack, Poet Scout (1905), bronze, height of bust: 24 in (61 cm), Autry Museum of the American West, Los Angeles California. Exhibited at the Pennsylvania Academy of the Fine Arts, 1907. John Wallace Crawford was an American adventurer, author, and storyteller.
- Stephendes Pferd (1912), bronze, height: 16.5 in (42 cm), statuette of a racehorse, private collection.
- Vases for Pennsylvania Building (1915), Panama-Pacific International Exposition, San Francisco, California.

=== With F. Edwin Elwell ===
- Greece (1907), pink Tennessee marble, cornice figures for the Alexander Hamilton U.S. Custom House, New York City. Zeller assisted F. Edwin Elwell on this work.
- Rome (1907), pink Tennessee marble, cornice figures for the Alexander Hamilton U.S. Custom House, New York City. Zeller assisted F. Edwin Elwell on this work.
- Dispatch Rider of the American Revolution (1907), bronze, height: 9 feet, Old Burying Ground Cemetery, Orange, New Jersey. Zeller assisted F. Edwin Elwell on this work.

== Gallery ==
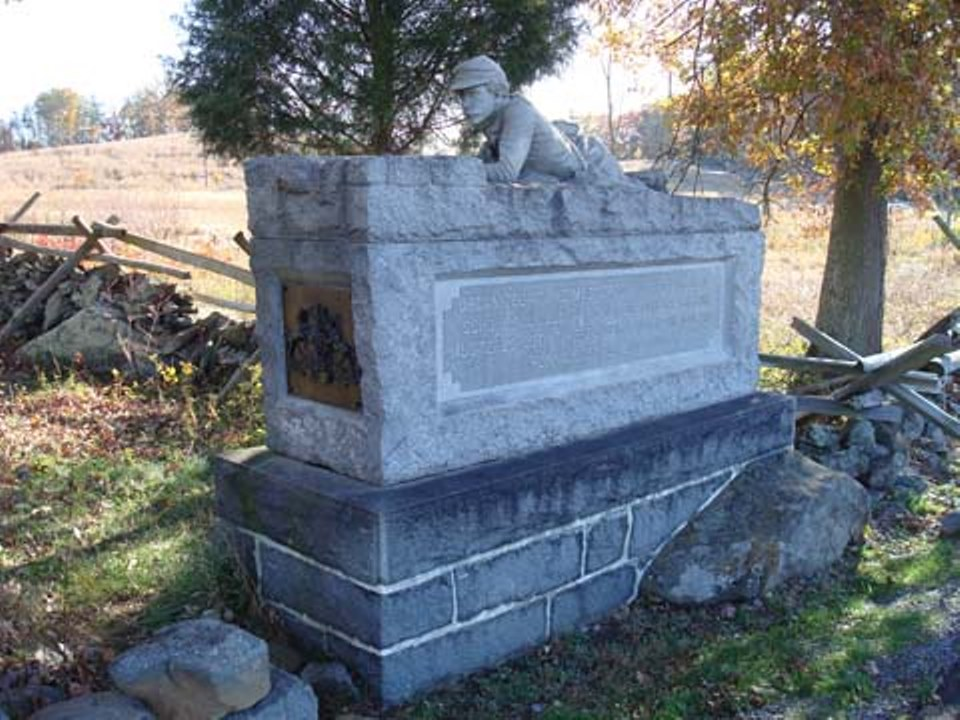
96th Pennsylvania Infantry Monument (1888), Gettysburg Battlefield

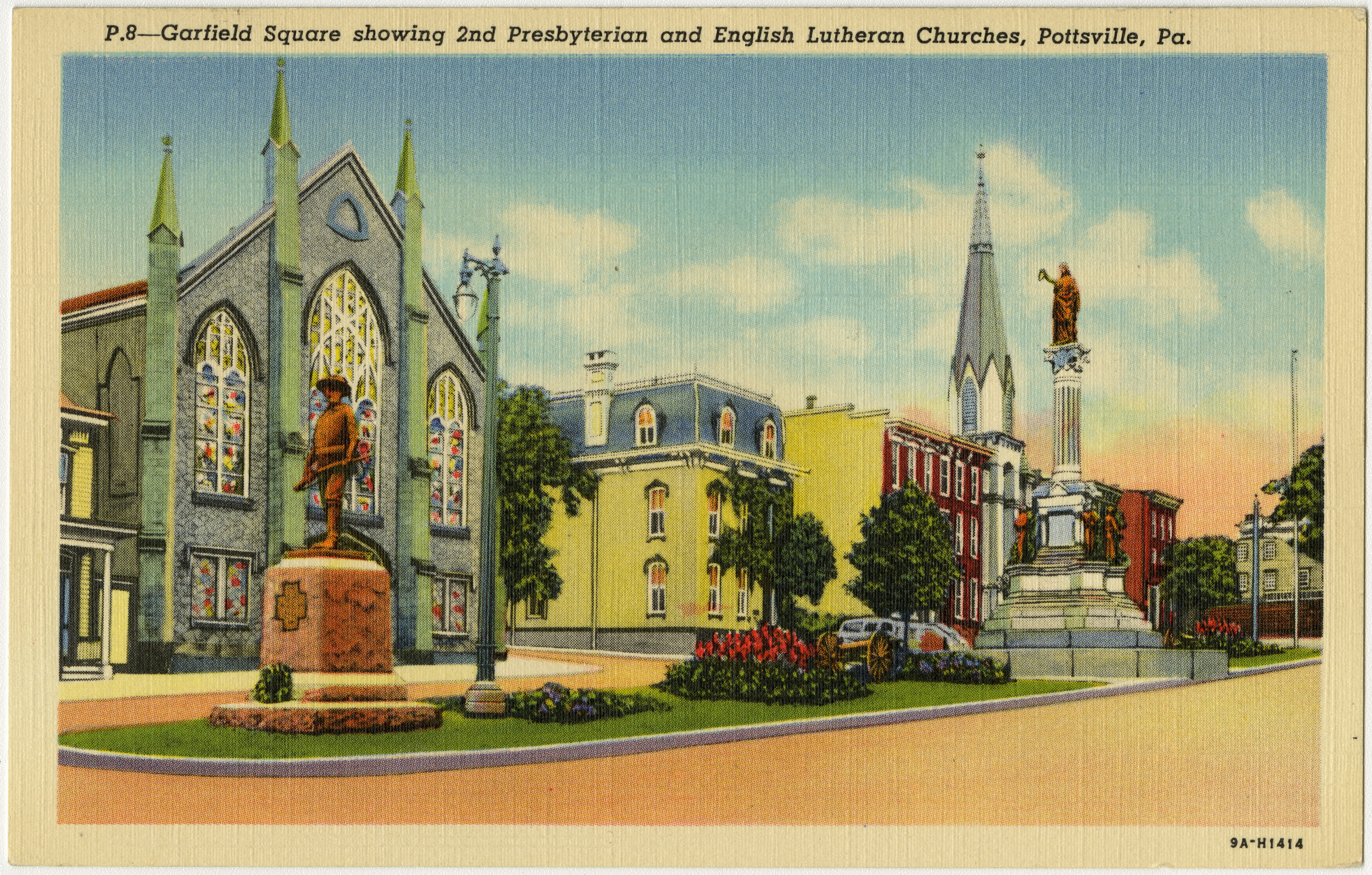
Schuylkill County Soldiers' and Sailors' Monument (1891), Pottsville, Pennsylvania

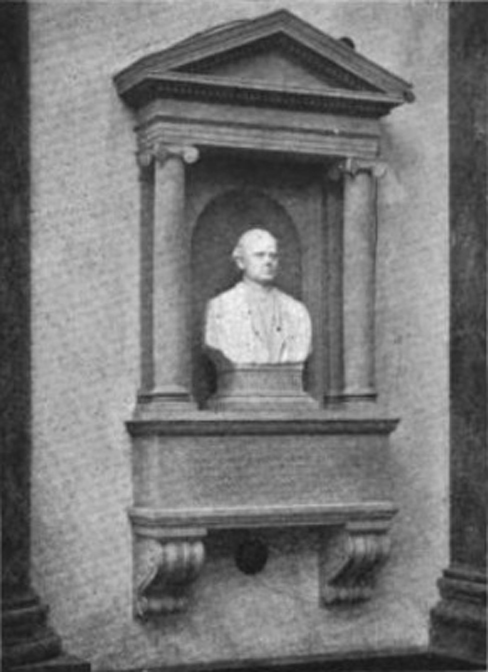
Bust of Judge Joseph Allison (1897), Philadelphia Court of Common Pleas

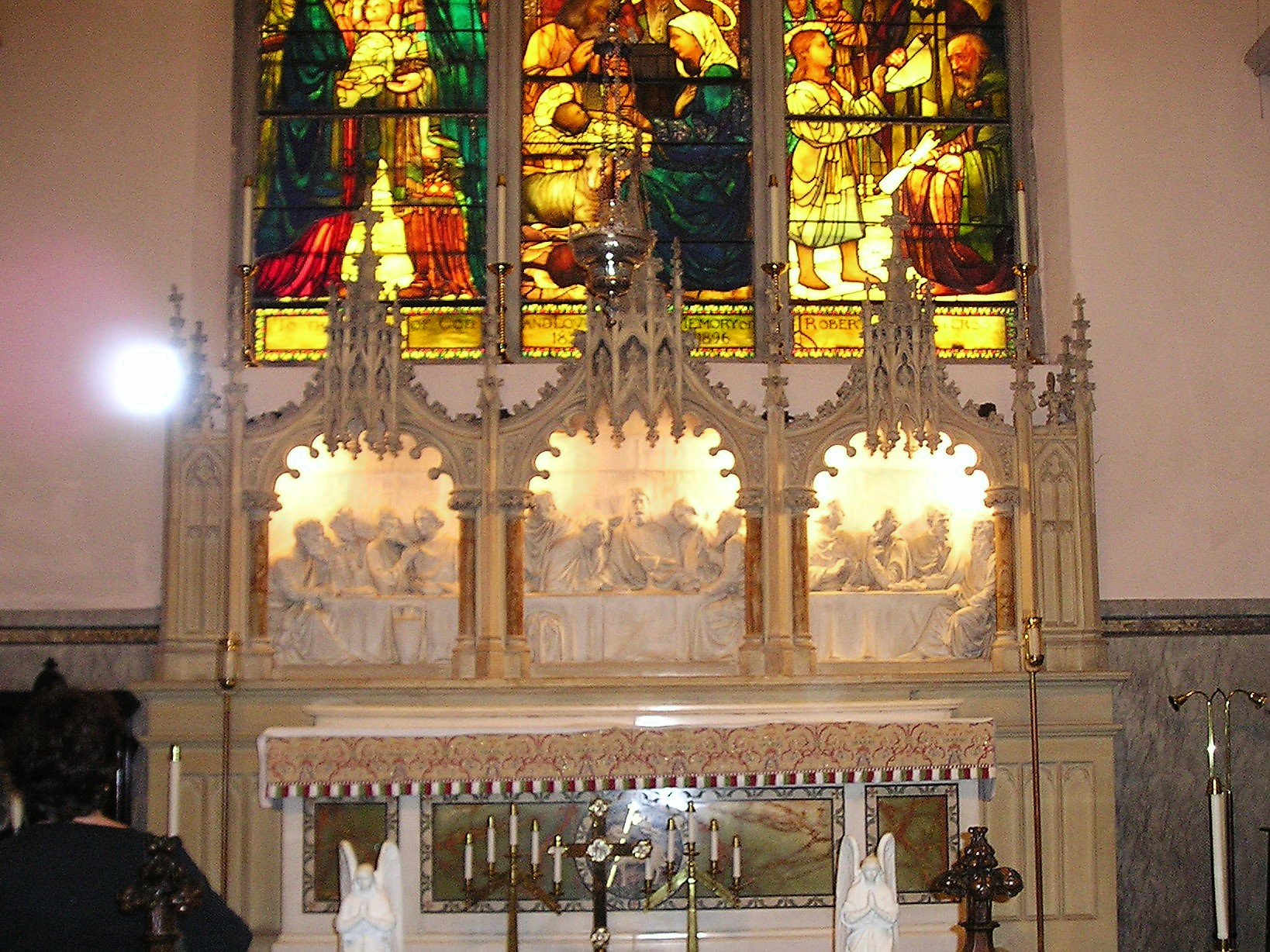
The Last Supper (1899), Holy Nativity Episcopal Church, Rockledge, Pennsylvania

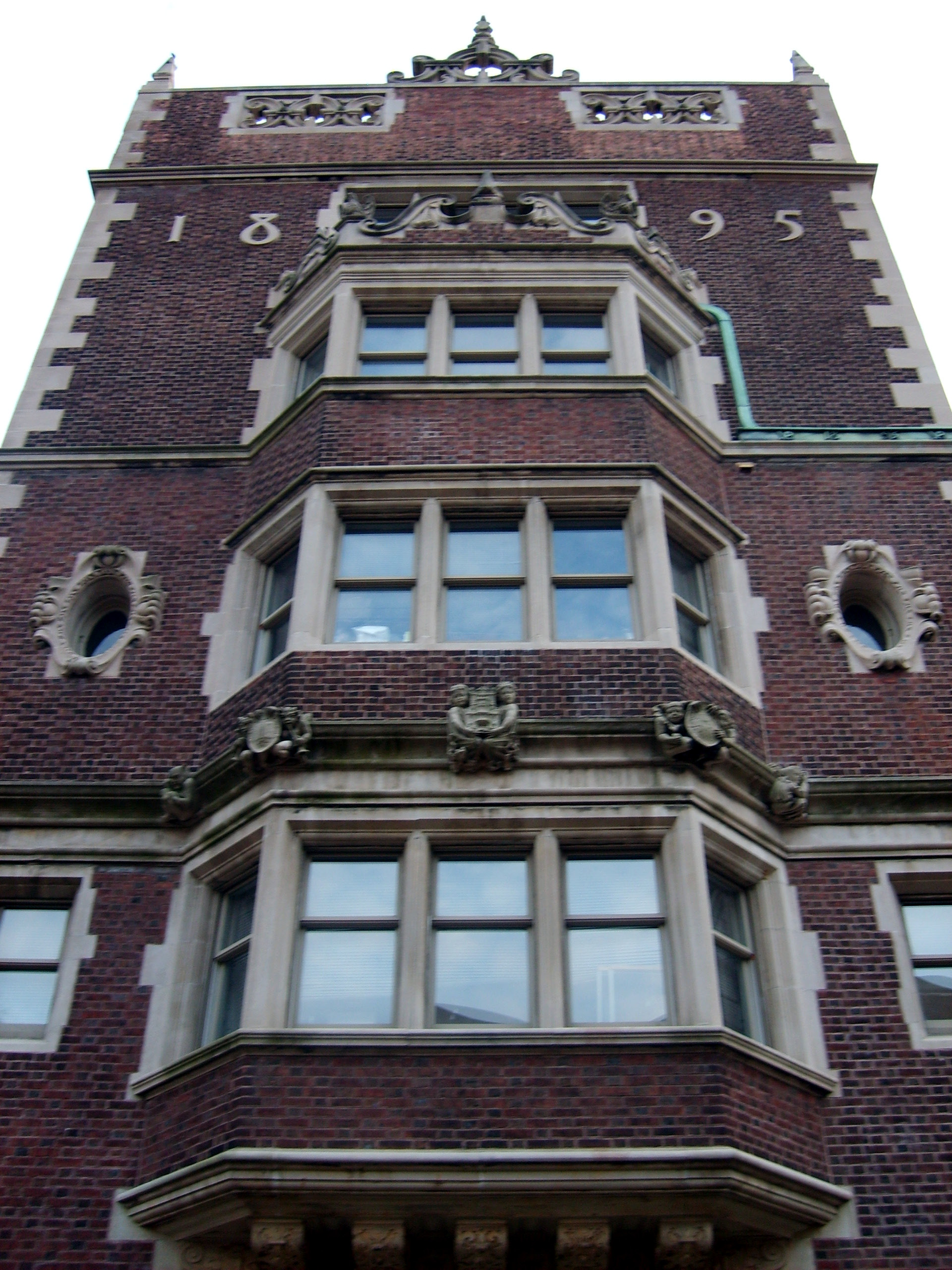
Carved bosses on Class of '87 House (1900), Quadrangle Dormitories, University of Pennsylvania

Greece (1907), F. Edwin Elwell & Zeller, U.S. Custom House, New York City

Rome (1907), F. Edwin Elwell & Zeller, U.S. Custom House, New York City

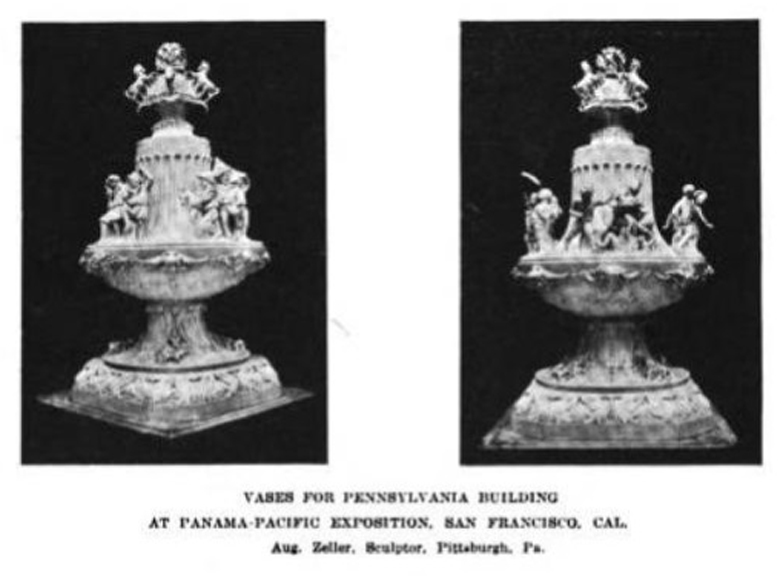
Vases for Pennsylvania Building (1915), Panama-Pacific International Exposition
