= Gabriel Thomas =

French sculptor

Gabriel-Jules Thomas
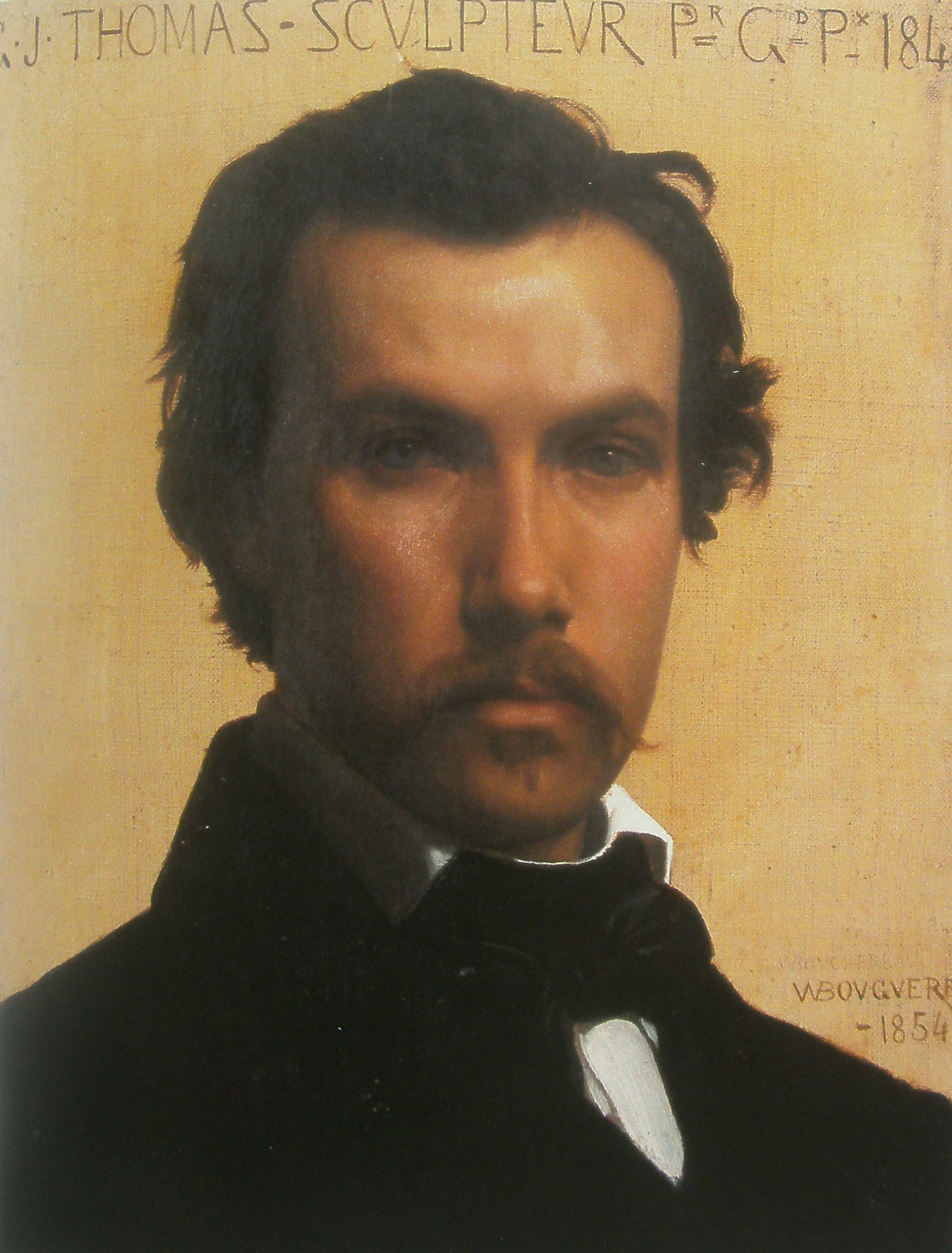
- Portrait of 1854 by William Bouguereau
- Born: 10 September 1824; Paris, France
- Died: 8 March 1905 (aged 80); Paris, France
- Known for: Sculpture, painting
- Awards: Bronze medal, Salon (1861); Gold medal, Exposition Universelle (1867); Gold medal, Exposition Universelle (1878)

Gabriel-Jules Thomas (10 September 1824 – 8 March 1905) was a French sculptor, born in Paris.

Thomas entered the École des Beaux-Arts in 1841 and in 1848 won the Prix de Rome in the sculpture category with his Philoctète partant pour le siège de Troie ("Philoctetes Leaves for the Siege of Troy") in plaster. This piece was briefly displayed in New York City at the Dahesh Museum of Art for their 2005–2006 exhibition entitled "The Legacy of Homer". It is normally kept at the Ecole Nationale Supérieure des Beaux-Arts in Paris.

He later taught at the Ecole. Among his students were Gaston Lachaise and American sculptor, August Zeller.

== Awards ==
He debuted at the Salon in 1857 and won a bronze medal in 1861. He received a gold medal at the Exposition Universelle of 1867, another at the Exposition Universelle of 1878 and a medal of honour in 1880.

== Works ==
- Virgil, 1861, marble, Paris, Musée d'Orsay
- Mademoiselle Mars, plaster, Musée des Beaux-Arts d'Angers
- The Stoning of St. Stephen, the church of Saint-Étienne-du-Mont, Paris, 1863
- Frankfurt, 1864–1865, stone, Paris, façade for the Gare du Nord train station
- Bust of Augustin Dumont, bronze, 1877, Pont-Audemer, Musée Alfred Canel
- Memorial to Baron Taylor, Père Lachaise Cemetery, Paris, circa 1879
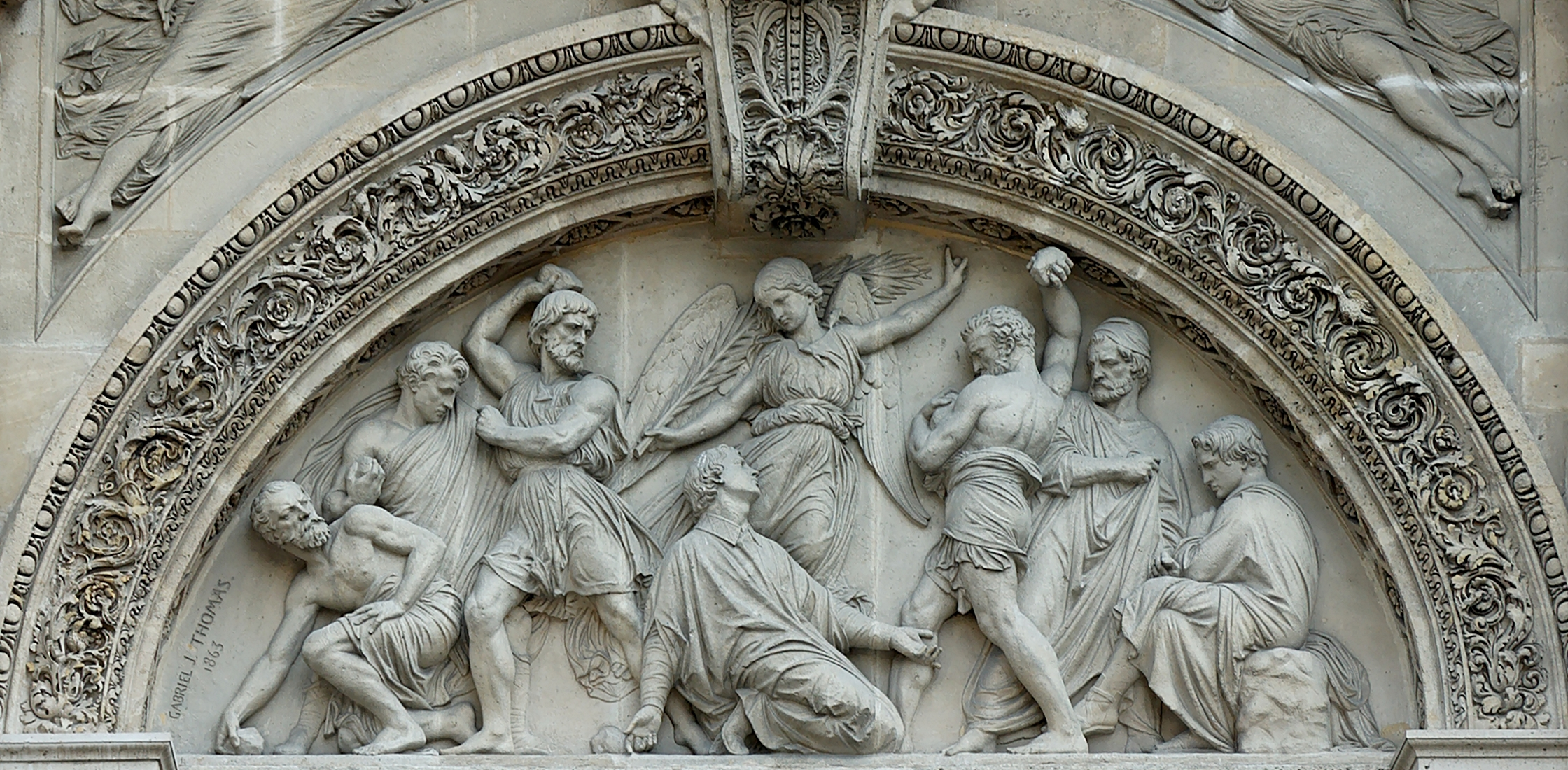
Tympanum, Saint-Étienne-du-Mont, Paris, 1863

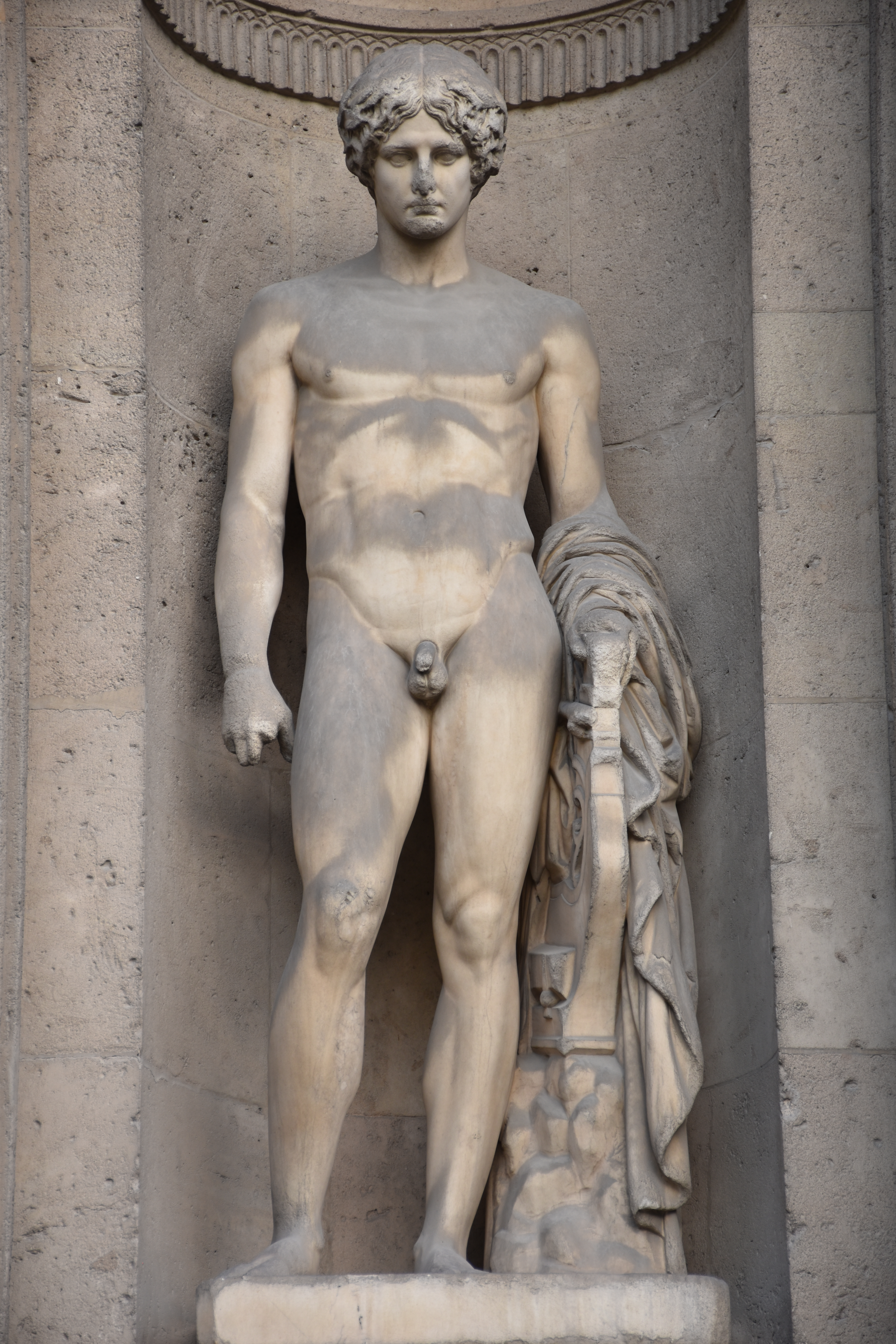
Orphée (1854), Paris, Cour Carrée, Louvre Palace
