= John Wilson Bubb =

US Army brigadier general (1843–1922)

- Bubb circa 1901
- Born: 26 April 1843; Danville, Pennsylvania, US
- Died: 22 February 1922 (aged 78); Wilmington, Delaware, US
- Burial place: Arlington National Cemetery
- Spouse: Frances Henrietta "Fannie" Steele (m. 1867–1922)
- Children: 7
- Military career
- Allegiance: Union (American Civil War); United States
- Service: Union Army; United States Army
- Service years: 1861–1866 (Union Army); 1866–1907 (US Army)
- Rank: Brigadier General
- Unit: US Army Infantry Branch
- Commands: Company D, 4th Infantry Regiment; Company K, 4th Infantry Regiment; US Indian Agent, Colville Reservation, Washington; Fort McPherson, Georgia; Camp Cleary, Georgia; 24th Infantry Regiment; 12th Infantry Regiment; Department of the Visayas; Department of Dakota
- Wars: American Civil War; American Indian Wars; Spanish–American War; Philippine–American War

John Wilson Bubb (26 April 1843 – 22 February 1922) was a career officer in the United States Army. An enlisted veteran of the Union Army during the American Civil War, he received his commission as an officer in 1866. Bubb went on to serve in the American Indian Wars, Spanish–American War, and Philippine–American War, and his commands included the 24th Infantry Regiment and 12th Infantry Regiment. Bubb attained the rank of brigadier general in April 1906 and commanded the Department of Dakota. He left the army upon reaching the mandatory retirement age of 64 in April 1907.

== Early life and start of career ==
John W. Bubb was born in Danville, Pennsylvania on 26 April 1843, a son of Frederick Bubb and Sarah J. (Wilson) Bubb. He was raised and educated in Danville, after which he was a laborer at a Danville iron mill. In September 1861 he joined the Union Army for the American Civil War. Assigned to Company E, 1st Battalion, 12th Infantry Regiment as a private, he advanced through the ranks to become the company's first sergeant. Bubb took part in several engagements, including the Battle of Fredericksburg, Battle of Gettysburg, First Battle of Petersburg, and Second Battle of Petersburg.

Bubb was taken as a prisoner of war in August 1864 and was imprisoned at Libby Prison and Belle Isle in Virginia, and Salisbury, North Carolina. After his release at the end of the war, he continued as a non-commissioned officer until 25 April 1866, when he was commissioned as an officer. Bubb was appointed a second lieutenant and promoted to first lieutenant on the same day, to date from 5 February 1866.

== Continued career ==
In September 1866, Bubb transferred to the 30th Infantry Regiment. He served with this unit until March 1869, when he transferred to the 4th Infantry Regiment. In 1867, he married Frances Henrietta "Fannie" Steele; they were married until his death and were the parents of seven children. (Note: Bubb's children included John Pearson Bubb, a 1905 graduate of the United States Military Academy who served in World War I and retired as a colonel.) Bubb remained with the 4th Infantry until October 1899, and saw extensive service in the western states during the American Indian Wars. In 1876, he served as commissary officer of the force commanded by George Crook during the Great Sioux War of 1876. His service with Crook's expedition included participation in the Battle of Slim Buttes in September 1876, the army's first significant victory since the defeat of George A. Custer at the Battle of the Little Bighorn. Bubb was promoted to captain in March 1879 and major in April 1898.

During Bubb's long service with the 4th Infantry, his postings included command of Company D, command of Company K, and US Indian Agent at the Colville Reservation in Washington state. Following the start of the Spanish–American War in 1898, Bubb commanded the post of Fort McPherson, Georgia. During the war, the post was the site of a general hospital and nearly 20,000 recruits passed through its training center before joining their units. It was also a prisoner of war facility, and 16 Spanish Army prisoners were incarcerated on its grounds. In August 1898, Bubb was assigned to command the newly established recruit depot at Camp Cleary near Pearl Springs in Newnan, Georgia.

== Later career ==
During the Philippine–American War, Bubb served in the Philippines from 1899 to 1902 and again from 1904 to 1906. In June 1899, he was commended for gallantry during combat near the city of Dasmariñas. In March 1925, he received a posthumous Citation Star to recognize his heroism in June 1899 fighting near the city of Imus; when the Silver Star award was created in 1932, Citation Stars were upgraded to the new medal. Bubb was promoted to lieutenant colonel of the 12th Infantry in October 1899. In July 1901, Bubb was promoted to colonel and assigned to command the 24th Infantry Regiment. In August, he transferred to command of the 12th Infantry. While serving in the Philippines in 1905, Bubb commanded the Department of the Visayas.

By April 1906, Bubb ranked high enough in seniority that he was in line for promotion to brigadier general. When a vacancy occurred, President Theodore Roosevelt desired to appoint John J. Pershing, who was then a captain. Army leaders, including William Howard Taft, then serving as Secretary of War, advocated for Bubb, and he received the appointment. (Note: Roosevelt nominated Pershing for promotion to brigadier general in September 1906.) After his promotion, Bubb served as commander of the Department of Dakota. He remained in this post until April 1907, when he reached the army's mandatory retirement age of 64.

In retirement, Bubb resided with sons and daughters in Galesburg, Illinois, Portland, Oregon, and Philadelphia, Pennsylvania before settling permanently in Wilmington, Delaware. His memberships included the Grand Army of the Republic, Military Order of the Loyal Legion of the United States, and Military Order of Foreign Wars. Bubb died in Wilmington on 22 February 1922. He was buried at Arlington National Cemetery.

== Dates of rank ==
Bubb's dates of rank were:

- Private to First Sergeant, 13 September 1861 to 24 April 1866
- Second Lieutenant, 24 April 1866 (to date from 5 February 1866)
- First Lieutenant, 24 April 1866 (to date from 5 February 1866)
- Captain, 16 March 1879
- Major, 26 April 1898
- Lieutenant Colonel, 20 October 1899
- Colonel, 1 July 1901
- Brigadier General, 3 April 1906
- Brigadier General (Retired), 26 April 1907

== In popular culture ==
Bubb is a character in the Deadwood episode "Sold Under Sin" (Season 1, Episode 12, 13 June 2004). The plot includes Crook's 1876 expedition arriving in Deadwood to resupply, and Bubb is depicted as Crook's quartermaster and commissary officer with the rank of captain. He is portrayed by actor Michael David Lally.
