= Anson Mills =

United States Army general and inventor (1834–1924)

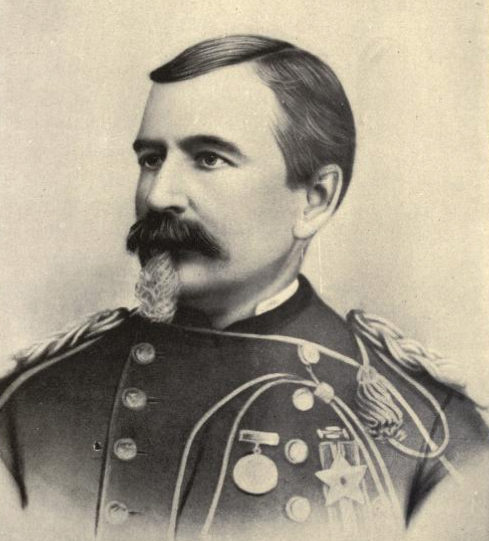
- Colonel Anson Mills
- Born: August 31, 1834; Thorntown, Indiana, US
- Died: November 5, 1924 (aged 90); Washington, DC, US
- Burial place: Arlington National Cemetery
- Military career
- Allegiance: United States; Union
- Branch: United States Army; Union Army
- Service years: 1861–1897
- Rank: Brigadier General (USA)
- Commands: 3rd Cavalry Regiment
- Conflicts: American Civil War: Battle of Shiloh; Battle of Stones River; Battle of Chickamauga; Atlanta campaign; Franklin–Nashville Campaign; American Indian Wars: Sioux Wars; Big Horn Expedition; Fort Reno Skirmish; Battle of Powder River; Northern Plains 1876 Summer Campaign; Battle of Prairie Dog Creek; Battle of Rosebud; Battle of Slim Buttes

Anson Mills (August 31, 1834 – November 5, 1924) was a United States Army officer, surveyor, inventor, and entrepreneur. Engaged in south Texas as a land surveyor and civil engineer, he both named and laid out the city of El Paso, Texas. Mills also invented a woven cartridge belt which late in life made his fortune.

== Biography ==
Mills was born on a farm near Thorntown, Indiana, the first of nine children to a father and mother of Quaker ancestry but with no particular interest in religion. As a young man, Mills worked on the farm but also became a practiced carpenter and weaver. In 1855, he entered West Point but in 1857 was dismissed for "deficiency in mathematics." Too embarrassed to return home, he taught school in McKinney, Texas and then moved on to El Paso to work as a surveyor, which included drawing up the original plat of the town.

When the Civil War broke out in 1861, he accepted a commission as a first lieutenant in the regular 18th Infantry regiment of the U.S. Army. His service was undistinguished, but he appeared at Shiloh (although he saw little action) and in the Murfreesboro, Chickamauga, Atlanta, and Nashville campaigns. He rose to the rank of captain by the end of the war and claimed never to have missed a day of service for any reason. From 1865 to 1893, Mills remained on duty with the Army, mostly engaged in campaigns against Indians, notably at the Battle of Powder River, the Battle of the Rosebud and the Battle of Slim Buttes (1876) where he led cavalry under the command of George Crook. Mills rose gradually to the rank of colonel and was appointed brigadier-general in 1897 when he was placed on the retired list.

Shortly after the Civil War, Mills began to improve the regulation cartridge belt by attempting to weave the whole belt in one piece without sewing. The improved belt was adopted by the U.S. Army, but the numbers needed by the frontier army were small. At the commencement of the Spanish–American War, Mills and his associates expanded their factory to produce a thousand belts a day, but the quick conclusion of the war left Mills practically bankrupt. Nevertheless, after giving some belts to Canadian troops headed for the Boer War, Mills soon received orders from the British government, and his success was assured. Having made a small fortune by 1905, Mills sold his interest.

In 1894, Mills was appointed a member of the International Boundary Commission that sought to settle cases involving the border with Mexico, including the Chamizal dispute (not finally concluded until 1963). While still a member of the commission, Mills constructed the reinforced concrete Anson Mills Building in El Paso, which was completed in 1911.

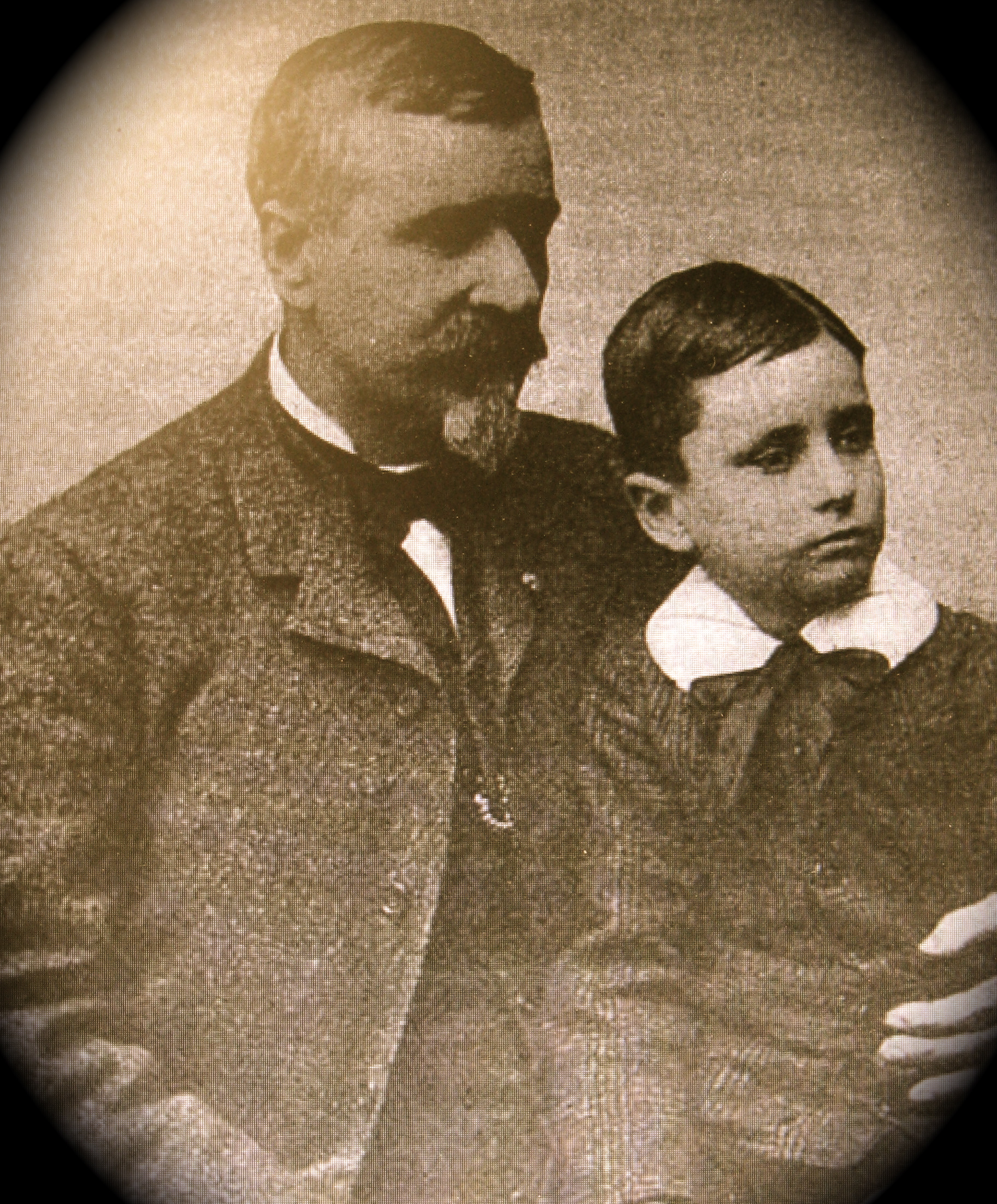
Anson Mills at 58 with his son, Anson Cassel Mills

Mills married Hannah Cassel of Zanesville, Ohio in 1868; they had three children, only one of which, a daughter, survived to maturity. Mills' son, Anson Cassel Mills, died of appendicitis in 1894 at the age of fifteen. On his grave marker in Arlington National Cemetery, Mills had inscribed, "A boy of sweet promise." Although generally conservative in his political views, Mills supported women's suffrage and prohibition and had indistinct religious beliefs. Mills completed and privately published an autobiography, My Story, in 1918. He retired from the boundary commission in 1914 and died in Washington, D.C., on November 5, 1924.
