= Battle of Slim Buttes =

1876 battle during the Great Sioux War

Coordinates: 45°32′36.3″N 103°07′29.1″W

- Part of the Great Sioux War of 1876
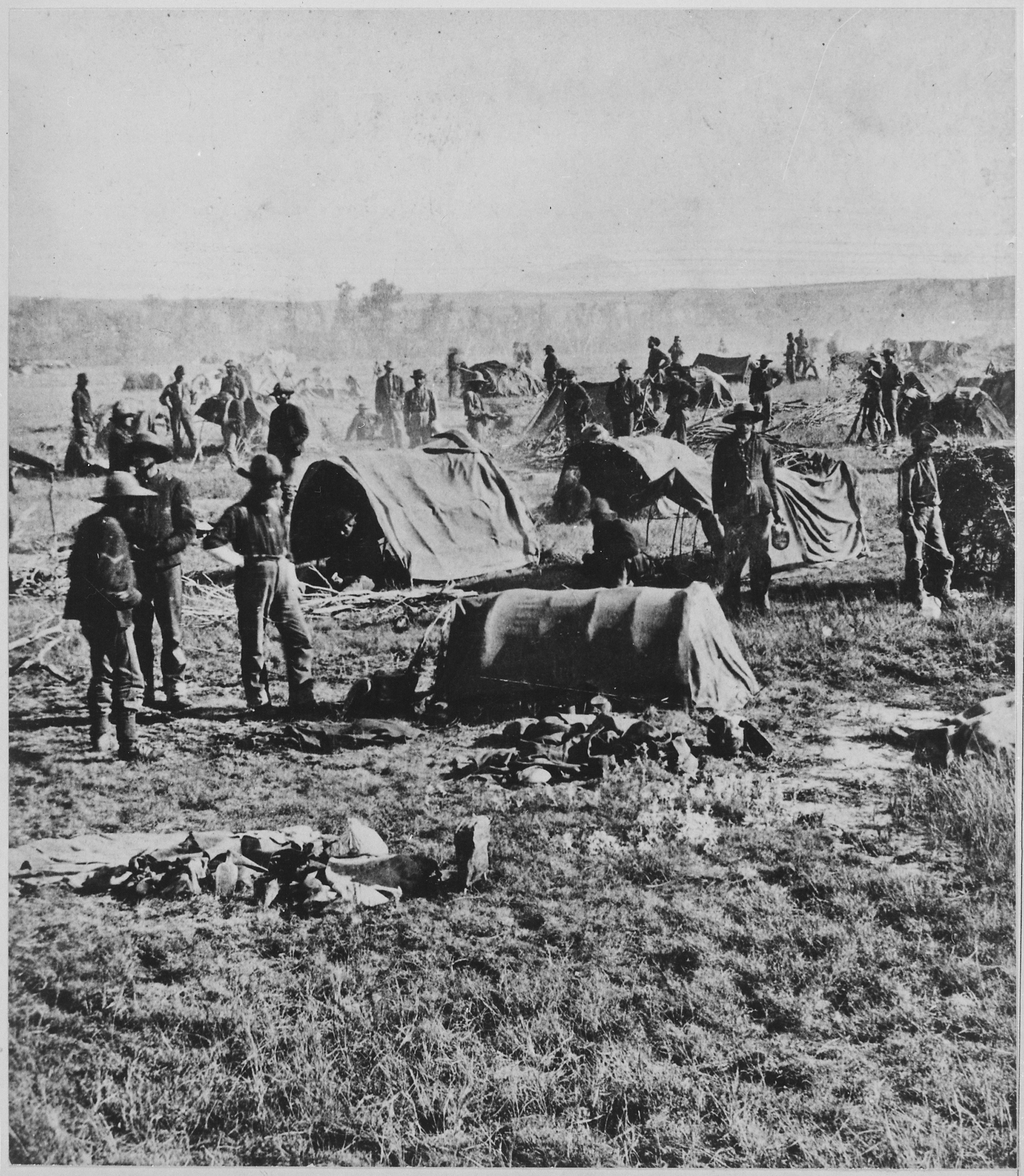
- "General Crook's headquarters in the field at Whitewood (Dak. Terr.). On starvation march 1876."
Date	September 9–10, 1876
Location	Great Sioux Reservation (Harding County, South Dakota)
Result	United States victory

Belligerents
Lakota	United States

Commanders and leaders
American Horse †; Crazy Horse	(United States) George Crook

Strength
~600–800	~1,200

Casualties and losses
10 killed unknown wounded 23 captured	3 killed 13 wounded

The Battle of Slim Buttes was fought on September 9–10, 1876, in the Great Sioux Reservation between the United States Army and Miniconjou Sioux during the Great Sioux War of 1876. It marked the first significant victory for the army since the stunning defeat of General George Custer at the Battle of Little Bighorn in June.

== Background ==
Following the Little Bighorn debacle, Lieutenant General Philip H. Sheridan, commanding the Department of Missouri, ordered the U.S. Army to convince the hostile Indians to return to their reservations. Generals Alfred Terry and George Crook took up an unsuccessful late summer chase of the Lakota and Cheyenne. The campaign resumed on August 5, and on August 10 the combined force, leaving its wagon train behind to unencumber the pursuit, moved east toward the Black Hills. Bad weather, extreme muddy conditions on the trail, and overtaxed men and animals led to the combined force breaking up on August 18, with Terry's men returning to their bases.

General Crook's force continued the pursuit but soon began running short of supplies. The general ordered his men to go on half rations. Soon, many of the men resorted to eating mule and horseflesh. A column under Captain Anson Mills, which included First Lieutenant John Wilson Bubb, was dispatched to Deadwood, a Black Hills mining town, to find supplies, and en route Mills and Bubb stumbled onto the Miniconjou Sioux village of American Horse.

== Battle ==
On the evening of September 8, 1876, near the present town of Reva, South Dakota, Captain Mills with his 150 troopers from the 3rd U.S. Cavalry surrounded the village of thirty-seven lodges and attacked it the next morning, shooting anyone who resisted. Taken by surprise, the Indians fled, with a mortally wounded American Horse and fifteen women and children hiding in a nearby ravine/draw. Having refused treatment by the army surgeons after surrendering, American Horse eventually died, as well as two women and one child. One Indian boy was found alive in the village, having slept through the initial fighting. Those Sioux who escaped spread the word to neighboring Sans Arc, Brulé and Cheyenne villages, telling Crazy Horse and other leaders that they had encountered 100-150 soldiers. Unknown to them, Crook's main column of infantry, artillery, and other cavalry had arrived.

Crazy Horse and 600-800 warriors quickly rode 10 miles northward towards American Horse's village, set in a depression among several hills. They reached an overlook, where they saw much larger than expected numbers of well-armed soldiers surrounding the village. From their positions atop the bluffs, the warriors opened fire, causing Crook to immediately form a defensive perimeter around his horses and mules. The general soon ordered the village to be set ablaze. Crook sent forward a line of skirmishers, with four companies of infantry in the lead, followed by dismounted troopers from three cavalry regiments. After a 45-minute steady firefight, the advancing soldiers drove most of the warriors from their hilltop positions. A few Sioux held their ground, even charging the perimeter of the 3rd Cavalry at one point, but were eventually chased away.

The soldiers seized 110 ponies in the village, as well as a supply of dried meat that was divided among Crook's ill and wounded men. Of emotional interest to the cavalrymen, they recovered a number of artifacts of the Battle of Little Bighorn, including a 7th Cavalry guidon from Company I, the bloody gauntlets of slain Capt. Myles Keogh, government-issued guns and ammunition, and other related items.

On September 10, Crook led his famished force away from the smoldering village, headed for the Black Hills and the promised food and supplies. The Sioux kept up a running fight with his troops for the next few days, before Crook finally made it to a supply column on September 15. The fighting at Slim Buttes cost the lives of two cavalrymen and one of Crook's civilian scouts, Charles "Buffalo Chips" White, as well as those of at least 10 Sioux.

== Aftermath ==
The army continued to seek out the remaining Indian encampments. Further significant battles were fought on November 25 with Dull Knife and Wild Hog on the Red Fork of the Powder River (the so-called Dull Knife Fight), and on January 8 with Crazy Horse at Wolf Mountain. Other assaults during the fall and winter convinced most of the Sioux and Cheyenne of the futility of fighting the soldiers. In May 1877, Crazy Horse surrendered at Fort Robinson and Sitting Bull led his remaining followers into Canada.

The Slim Buttes battle site is on private land. A nearby monument commemorates the fighting.

== Order of battle ==
Sioux

- American Horse's band of Miniconjou Sioux (37 lodges; perhaps 30-40 warriors)
- Crazy Horse's mixed band of Sans Arcs, Brule, and others (600-800)

U.S. Army

- Department of the Platte - Brig. Gen. George Crook
  - 2nd U.S. Cavalry – Troops A, B, D, E, and I
  - 3rd U.S. Cavalry – Troops A, B, C, D, E, F, G, I, L, and M: Capt. Anson Mills
  - 5th U.S. Cavalry – Troops A, B, C, D, E, F, G, I, K, and M: Lt. Col. Eugene A. Carr
  - 4th U.S. Infantry – Companies D, F, and G
  - 9th U.S. Infantry – Companies C, G, and H
  - 14th U.S. Infantry – Companies B, C, F, and I

== See also ==
- History of South Dakota
- Plains Indians Wars
