= Charles Morton (brigadier general) =

US Army brigadier general (1846–1914)

- Morton as a major in 1898
- Born: 18 March 1846; Chagrin Falls, Ohio, US
- Died: 20 December 1914 (aged 68); Washington, DC, US
- Burial place: Arlington National Cemetery
- Education: United States Military Academy
- Spouse(s): Elizabeth Lloyd Easton (m. 1873) Sabina Page Pemberton (m. 1904–1914)
- Children: 5
- Military career
- Allegiance: Union (American Civil War); United States
- Service: Missouri State Guard (MSG); Union Army; United States Military Academy (USMA); United States Army
- Service years: 1861 (MSG); 1861–1864 (Union Army); 1865–1869 (USMA); 1869–1910 (US Army)
- Rank: Brigadier General
- Unit: US Army Cavalry Branch
- Commands: Camp Eagle Pass; Troop A, 3rd Cavalry Regiment; 4th Cavalry Regiment; Pasay Barracks; 8th Cavalry Regiment; Maneuver Camp, Crow Creek Timber Reserve; Fort Sill; 7th Cavalry Regiment; Camp George H. Thomas; Cavalry Brigade, West Point, Kentucky; Cavalry Brigade, Manassas, Virginia; Cavalry Camp, Fort Myer; Fort Myer; Camp McGrath; Department of the Missouri; Provisional Division, Fort Riley
- Wars: American Civil War; American Indian Wars; Spanish–American War; Philippine–American War; Military Government of Cuba; Moro Rebellion

Charles Morton (18 March 1846 – 20 December 1914) was a career officer in the United States Army. A Union Army veteran of the American Civil War, after graduating from the United States Military Academy at West Point in 1869, he served in the American Indian Wars, Spanish–American War, Philippine–American War, Military Government of Cuba, and Moro Rebellion. Morton attained the rank of brigadier general and retired in 1910.

== Early life ==
Charles Morton was born in Chagrin Falls, Ohio on 18 March 1846, a son of Charles Eldridge Morton and Huldah (Atwater) Morton. He was raised and educated in Ohio until 1854, when his family moved to Daviess County, Missouri. At the start of the American Civil War in April 1861, Morton joined a company of the Missouri State Guard that was formed to protect the Hannibal and St. Joseph Railroad. In July, he joined the 13th Missouri Infantry as a private. This regiment was later reorganized as the 25th Missouri Infantry Regiment, and later the 1st Missouri Engineer Regiment, and Morton served until receiving his discharge in September 1864. His wartime service included participation in several battles and engagements, including the Battle of Shiloh, Siege of Corinth, Siege of Atlanta, Battle of Lovejoy's Station, and Battle of Jonesborough.

In May 1865, Morton was a resident of DeKalb County, Missouri when he was selected for attendance at the United States Military Academy. He studied there from 1865 to 1869 and graduated ranked 25th of 39. Among his classmates who also served as general officers were Earl Dennison Thomas, Samuel Escue Tillman, William P. Duvall, and William W. Robinson Jr. Among his prominent classmates who did not attain general's rank were Eric Bergland, Arthur Sherburne Hardy, John Gregory Bourke, and James Ezekiel Porter. At graduation, Morton received his commission as a second lieutenant of Cavalry.

== Start of career ==
Morton as a captain in 1885

After receiving his commission in June 1869, Morton was assigned to the 3rd Cavalry Regiment and posted to duty at Fort Union, New Mexico Territory. In December 1869, he performed temporary duty escorting recruits from the railroad depot at Sheridan, Kansas to Fort Union. From December 1869 to February 1870, he was posted to an army camp at Cinnamon Pass, part of the Ute Agency in New Mexico. From February to August 1870, he took part in his regiment's march to and garrisoning of Camp Rawlins in Yavapai County, Arizona Territory. From August 1870 to December 1871, he was assigned to Fort Verde, Arizona, and he took part in American Indian Wars engagements against the Apache people in June 1871. (Note: In February 1890, Morton was approved for promotion to brevet first lieutenant, to date from June 1871, in recognition of gallantry against the Apache; he declined the honor.) He then took part in a march to Fort D. A. Russell, Wyoming, where he served until May 1872. Morton was next posted to Fort Sidney, Nebraska, where he served until April 1875, including Indian Wars patrols and scouting duties.

In April 1875, Morton was assigned to duty at Fort Laramie, Wyoming, where he remained until May 1875. He was next detailed to escort and Engineer officer duties during an expedition to the Black Hills of Wyoming and South Dakota, where he remained until October 1875. Morton then returned to Fort D. A. Russell, and he took part in the Big Horn Expedition of 1876, including the Battle of Powder River against the Cheyenne in March 1876. He then participated in the Yellowstone Expedition until October 1876, including battles on the Tongue River and the Battle of the Rosebud in June, and the Battle of Slim Buttes in September 1876. During the 1876 campaigns, Morton served primarily as adjutant to Lieutenant Colonel William B. Royall, who led the cavalry assigned to Crook's command (companies from the 3rd Cavalry 2nd Cavalry regiments). He then returned to the garrison at Fort Laramie, where he remained until June 1878. Morton was promoted to first lieutenant in September 1876.

== Family ==
In 1873, Morton married Elizabeth Lloyd Easton Morton, known as "Bessie," the daughter of Brevet Major General Langdon Cheves Easton and Elizabeth Lloyd (Beall) Easton; Rufus Easton was her grandfather. The Mortons were the parents of five children:

- Charles Easton Morton: US Army colonel
- Bessie M. Morton Spence: Wife of Wisconsin business executive Edmund R. Spence
- Emmet Crawford Morton: US Army lieutenant colonel
- Sibley Morton: Born and died in 1880
- Adele Picot Morton Spring: Wife of Colonel John V. Spring

In 1884, George Francis Chase, a first lieutenant with the 3rd Cavalry Regiment accused Daniel Hall Boughton, a second lieutenant in the 3rd Cavalry with whom he had a long running personal dispute, of conducting an extramarital affair with Mrs. Morton. Chase threatened Boughton with exposure unless he resigned; instead, Boughton informed Charles Morton, who was his superior as commander of Troop A. In 1885 court-martial proceedings pressed by Boughton and Charles Morton, Mrs. Morton attested to her innocence, as did Boughton. Chase was convicted of charges unbecoming an officer for falsely disparaging the reputations of Boughton and Mrs. Morton; he was sentenced to dismissal from the service, which President Grover Cleveland commuted to a year's suspension on half pay. (Note: Both Chase and Boughton continued to serve; Chase attained the rank of brigadier general, retired in 1912, and died in 1925. Boughton graduated from Washington University in St. Louis with an LL.B. in 1897 and was still on duty as a colonel when he died in 1914.)

As indicated in the 1900 US Census, the Mortons were living separately that June; at some point they divorced, as shown by Charles Morton's marriage to Sabina A. (Page) Pemberton in 1904; Elizabeth Easton Morton died in 1906. Sabina Page Morton survived Charles Morton and died in 1943. She was the sister in law of US Senator Miles Poindexter and the aunt of actress Gale Page.

== Continued career ==
Morton as a captain in 1892

Morton was assigned to duty at Camp Devin, Wyoming from June to September 1878. From October 1878 to February 1881 he served at the Jefferson Barracks, Missouri Cavalry depot. He was then assigned to Cavalry duty at Fort McKinney, Wyoming, where he served until May 1882. Morton's next posting was at Fort Thomas, Arizona, where he served until October 1884. In July 1882, he took part in combat against Apache people along the Chevelon Creek in Arizona. He was promoted to captain in November 1883. From October 1884 to March 1885, Morton was assigned to the garrison at Fort Apache, Arizona. In June 1885, he was posted to Fort Concho, Texas, where he served until April 1886. He was then assigned to duty at Fort Clark, Texas, where he served until May 1888. Morton's next duty was command of in command of Camp Eagle Pass, Texas, where he served until September 1891. From September 1891 to February 1892, Morton served with the garrison Fort Sam Houston, Texas. After serving at Fort Ringgold as commander of Troop A, 3rd Cavalry from February to March 1892, he performed recruiting duty in Milwaukee, Wisconsin until October 1894.

Morton performed garrison duty at Fort Sill, Indian Territory until April 1895, which was followed by assignment as professor of military science and tactics at the De La Salle Institute in New York City, where he served until May 1898. The Spanish–American War began in April 1898 and Morton commanded 2nd Squadron, 3rd Cavalry during organization and training in Florida in June and July, and continued in command during the Siege of Santiago in Cuba in August 1898. He was promoted to major in the 4th Cavalry Regiment in September 1898, after which he was assigned to duty at Fort Ethan Allen, Vermont. He served with the 4th Cavalry at Fort Walla Walla, Washington from December 1898 to March 1899. Morton performed detached duty at Fort Vancouver, Washington in April 1899, where he was assigned as member of a board that considered officers for promotion. In May 1899, he commanded forces at Coeur d'Alene, Idaho during the government's response to labor unrest among Idaho miners.

Morton departed the United States with the 4th Cavalry for Philippine–American War duty in June 1899 and commanded the regiment from June to August. After arriving in Manila in July, he was assigned as Manila's assistant provost marshal, and he served in this post until October 1899. From October 1899 to January 1900, he commanded 2nd Squadron, 4th Cavalry on a Philippines expedition commanded by General Henry Ware Lawton, which included combat at San Miguel, Sibul, and Biac na‑Bato, Luzon in December 1899. In January 1900, he took part in scouting expeditions near Norzagaray. From January 1900 to March 1901, he commanded the garrison at Pasay Barracks and served on investigating commissions, courts martial, and promotion boards. He commanded a squadron of the 4th Cavalry on a march from Pasay to Taal in March 1901, and commanded the western portion of Batangas Province in March and April. Morton was promoted to lieutenant colonel in the 8th Cavalry Regiment in March 1901, but continued to serve with the 4th Cavalry until August 1901.

== Later career ==
After returning to the United States in August, Morton was assigned to duty at Fort Walla Walla. After a leave of absence from October 1901 to January 1902, he took command of the 8th Cavalry at Camp Ranald S. Mackenzie in Puerto Principe during the Military Government of Cuba. He returned to the United States in March and served first at Fort Reno, Indian Territory; in April 1902, he transferred to Jefferson Barracks, where he served until October. He performed detached duty at Fort Zachary Taylor, Key West, Florida in April and May. Morton was on detached service commanding the maneuver camp at Crow Creek Timber Reserve, Wyoming from July to August 1902. In September, he performed detached duty at Fort Yellowstone, Wyoming. From October 1902 to April 1903, Morton commanded the post at Fort Sill. In February 1903, he was promoted to colonel and took command of the 11th Cavalry Regiment, and in April he was transferred to the 7th Cavalry. From May 1903 to September 1904, he commanded Camp George H. Thomas, Georgia and the 7th Cavalry, and he continued in command of the 7th Cavalry until April 1907.

Morton participated in maneuvers at West Point, Kentucky in September and October 1903, during which he commanded a Cavalry brigade. During maneuvers at Manassas, Virginia in August and September 1904, he again commanded a Cavalry brigade. He commanded a Cavalry Camp at Fort Myer, Virginia in October and November 1904, and he commanded the post at Fort Myer from November 1904 to May 1905. He performed detached duty at Governors Island, New York in November 1904. Morton traveled to the Philippines between May and July 1905; after his arrival for duty during the Moro Rebellion, he commanded the post of Camp McGrath, Batangas until April 1907. He performed detached in Manila in July 1906 and at Fort William McKinley from October to December 1906. In April 1907, Morton received promotion to brigadier general. He departed the Philippines in May 1907 and returned to the United States via the Siberian Railway and Europe. He reached the United States in mid-August and was on a leave of absence until 30 September.

Morton commanded the post at Fort D. A. Russell during October 1907. He was then assigned to command the Department of the Missouri, which he led until December 1908. In September 1908, he commanded a provisional division that marched from Fort Riley, Kansas to St. Joseph, Missouri, where it participated in a well-attended military tournament. In October 1908, he was on duty at Fort D. A. Russell, where he led a project to determine locations for street railway sidings. In October, November, and December 1908, Morton took part in several courts-martial at Fort Wayne, Michigan. In 1908, he accompanied the remains of Captain Emmet Crawford, which were moved from Kearney, Nebraska to re‑interment at Arlington National Cemetery. In December 1908, Morton was assigned to detached duty in Omaha, Nebraska, where he balanced his Department of the Missouri accounts and completed reports until March, when he reached the mandatory retirement age of 64. In retirement, he was a resident of Washington, DC. Morton died in Washington on 20 December 1914. He was buried at Arlington National Cemetery.

== Effective dates of rank ==
Morton's dates of rank were:

- Private, Missouri Home Guard, April to July 1861
- Private, 25th Missouri Infantry Regiment, July 1861 to September 1864
- Cadet, United States Military Academy, 1 July 1865 to 14 June 1869
- Second Lieutenant, 15 June 1869
- First Lieutenant (Brevet), 5 June 1871 (Awarded 27 February 1890; declined)
- First Lieutenant, 25 September 1876
- Captain, 17 November 1883
- Major, 23 September 1898
- Lieutenant Colonel, 24 March 1901
- Colonel, 25 February 1903
- Brigadier General, 19 April 1907
- Brigadier General (Retired), 18 March 1910
