= William Royall =

William Royall may refer to:

- William Royall (settler), (c. 1595–1676), English settler of North Yarmouth, Maine
- William B. Royall (1825–1895), Union Army officer during the American Civil War
