= 25th Missouri Infantry Regiment =

25th Missouri Infantry Regiment 13th Missouri Infantry Regiment
- Active: June 1861 to February 17, 1864
- Country: United States
- Allegiance: Union
- Branch: Union Army
- Role: Infantry
- Engagements: American Civil War: Battle of Lexington; Battle of Shiloh; Battle of Pea Ridge; Advance on and Siege of Corinth; Operations Against Guerrillas in NW Missouri

The 25th Missouri Infantry Regiment, originally formed as 13th Missouri Volunteer Infantry, was an infantry regiment that served in the Union Army during the American Civil War.

== Service ==
Organized as 13th Missouri Infantry Regiment in June, 1861. Designation changed to 25th Missouri Infantry Regiment in September, 1861. Attached to Dept. of Missouri to March, 1862. 1st Brigade, 6th Division, Army of the Tennessee, to July, 1862, 1st Brigade, 6th Division, District of Corinth, Miss., to September, 1862. 1st Brigade, 2nd Division, District of Southeast Missouri, Dept. of Missouri, to March, 1863. District of Northwest Missouri to June, 1863. New Madrid, Mo., District of Columbus, Ky., 6th Division, 16th Army Corps, Dept. of the Tennessee, to February, 1864.

== Detailed service ==
Duty in Missouri until March, 1862. Fought in the Battle of Pea Ridge, AR March 6–8. Ordered to Pittsburg Landing, Tenn. Battle of Shiloh, Tenn., April 6–7. Advance on and siege of Corinth, Miss., April 29-May 30. Duty at Corinth, Miss., building fortifications until September. Ordered to St. Louis, Mo., thence to Pilot Knob and Patterson, Mo. Duty in Southeast Missouri until March, 1863. Moved to Iron Mountain, thence to St. Joseph, Mo., and operating against guerrillas in Northwest Missouri until June. Ordered to New Madrid, Mo., and garrison duty there and reconstructing fortifications until February, 1864. Consolidated with Bissell's Engineer Regiment of the West to form the 1st Regiment Missouri Volunteer Engineers on February 17, 1864.

== Casualties ==
During its service, the regiment lost 6 officers and 51 enlisted men who were killed or mortally wounded, and 3 officers and 112 enlisted men who died of disease, for a total of 172 casualties.

== Commanders ==
- Colonel Everett Peabody †
- Colonel Chester Harding Jr.

== Notable members ==
- Charles Morton, served as a private, graduated from the United States Military Academy in 1869, retired in 1910 as a brigadier general.

== See also ==
- Missouri Civil War Union units
- Missouri in the Civil War
