= Everett Peabody =

Union Army officer (1830–1862)

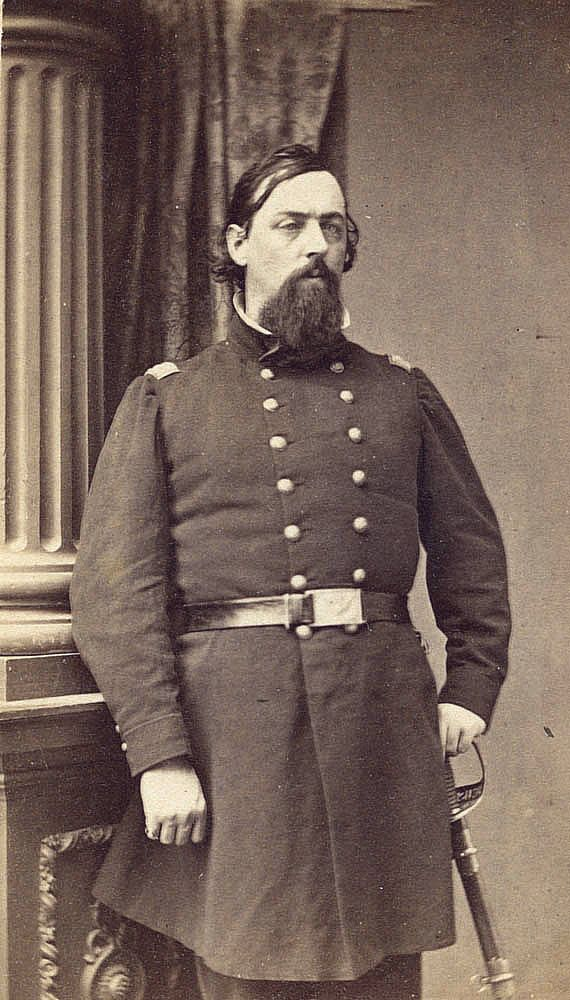
- Born: June 13, 1830; Springfield, Massachusetts
- Died: April 6, 1862 (aged 31); Shiloh, Tennessee
- Burial place: Massachusetts
- Military career
- Allegiance: United States of America; Union
- Branch: United States Army; Union Army
- Service years: 1861 - 1862
- Rank: Colonel
- Commands: 25th Missouri Volunteer Infantry
- Conflicts: American Civil War: Battle of Lexington; Battle of Shiloh
- Other work: civil engineer

Everett Peabody (June 13, 1830 – April 6, 1862) was a Harvard graduate and civil engineer working for various railroads in Massachusetts and Missouri. He is best remembered for his service as a colonel in the Union army during the Civil War, in particular his role in the Battle of Shiloh, where he was killed in action.

== Biography ==
Peabody was born in Springfield, Massachusetts in 1830. He first attended Burlington College before transferring to and graduating from Harvard University in 1849. He started working in the railroad industry in Massachusetts before taking a position with the Hannibal & St. Joseph Railroad. This new job brought him to reside in St. Joseph, Missouri. By 1859, he was chief engineer of Platte County Railroad.

=== Civil War ===
When the Civil War began Peabody, living in the highly divided state of Missouri, made his devotion to the Union known. He was first appointed major in the 13th Missouri Volunteer Regiment and then on September 1, 1861 he was appointed colonel of the regiment. The regiment was posted to garrison duty at Lexington, Missouri. There Colonel Peabody took an active part in the First Battle of Lexington where he was hit by a spent bullet in the chest. Painful, but not serious, Peabody was being carried off the field on a stretcher when he was hit a second time in the foot. The combination of the two wounds would incapacitate him for several weeks. Peabody and the rest of the garrison were taken prisoner after the Union surrender on September 20, 1861. He was officially exchanged in December 1861. Due to his regiment's capture it was removed from the official roster of Missouri regiments and another "13th Missouri" had meanwhile been created in its place. Peabody went about rebuilding his regiment which was now designated the 25th Missouri.

=== Shiloh ===
In March, 1862, Peabody and the 25th Missouri were ordered to join the Army of the Tennessee at Pittsburg Landing as part of the Sixth Division under Brig. Gen. Benjamin Prentiss. Being the ranking officer Peabody assumed command of the 1st Brigade of almost entirely green recruits (Peabody being an exception as a combat veteran at Lexington).

The camps of Prentiss' and William T. Sherman's divisions were placed in the most forward positions of the Army of the Tennessee. During the night of April 5, Union pickets claimed to have seen Confederate activity in the nearby woods. Both Sherman and Prentiss dismissed these reports, Sherman even claiming there were no Confederates nearer than Corinth. Peabody, however, was convinced there was in fact Confederate activity nearby. In the early morning hours of April 6, on his own authority, he sent out a patrol under Major James Edwin Powell. He ordered Powell that if he encountered the enemy to “drive in the guard and open up on the reserve, develop the force, hold the ground as long as possible, then fall back.” Peabody hoped that this would temporarily interrupt the Confederates' plans and, more importantly, provide a warning to Union units in time to prepare for the coming onslaught. Powell's reconnaissance engaged the Confederates and discovered their ranks already in battle formation. Fighting erupted and Peabody sent reinforcements into the fight. An angry General Prentiss soon rode up and said he would hold Peabody "personally responsible for bringing on this engagement". Peabody replied that he took responsibility for all his actions. By bringing on the engagement early, Peabody had disrupted the Confederates' agenda and gave warning, albeit short, to the rest of Sherman's and Prentiss' camps.

Prior to the engagement, Peabody had written to his parents stating "if I go under, it shal' be in a manner that the old family shall feel proud of". With the battle now fully developing, Peabody led the rest of his brigade against the rebel brigade of General S.A.M. Wood. Prentiss and Sherman reinforced Peabody's regiments as elements of the brigade began to retreat. Peabody had already sustained three wounds when the fourth bullet hit him square in the face, killing him instantly. Major James Edwin Powell also died that early morning.

On April 9, Peabody was buried near the location of his headquarters. The Peabody Monument at Shiloh National Military Park marks this spot. After the first burial, his body was exhumed and reinterred at the Springfield Cemetery in his hometown of Springfield.

== See also ==
- Bibliography of Ulysses S. Grant
