= Fort Union =

Fort Union may refer to:

- Fort Union Formation, an economically important geologic formation in the northwestern United States
- Fort Union National Monument, site of a U. S. Army fort in New Mexico from 1851 to 1891
- Fort Union Trading Post National Historic Site, a trading post of the American Fur Company, operating between 1828 and 1867
- Fort Union, a major commercial area in Salt Lake County, Utah
- Fort Union (Wisconsin)

== See also ==
- Fork Union, Virginia
