= Battle of Shiloh =

1862 battle of the American Civil War

Coordinates: 35°08′19″N 88°20′32″W

- Part of the Western theater of the American Civil War
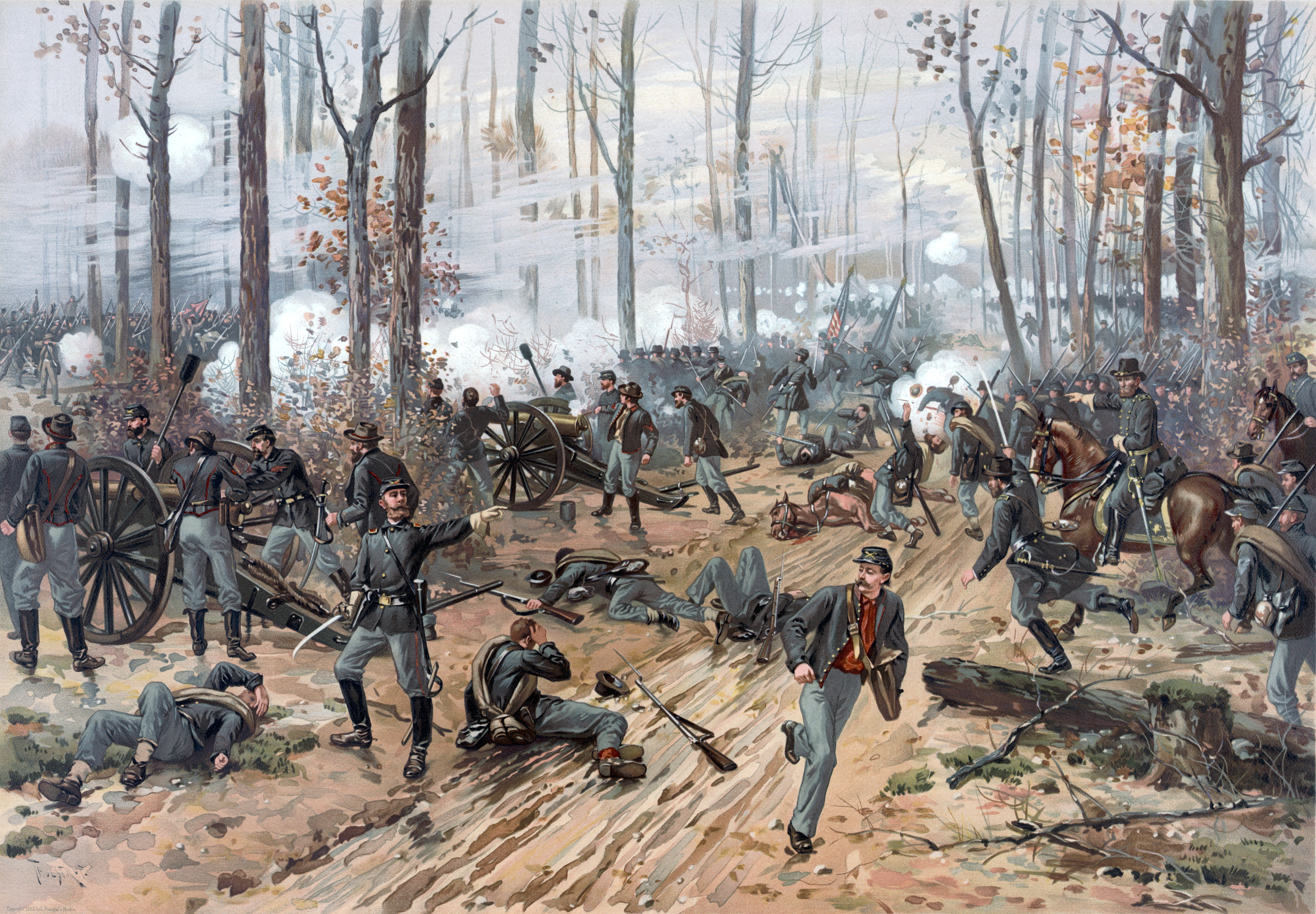
- 1888 illustration of the battle
Date	April 6–7, 1862
Location	Hardin County, Tennessee
Result	Union victory

Belligerents
United States (Union)	Confederate States

Commanders and leaders
Ulysses S. Grant; Don Carlos Buell	Albert Sidney Johnston †; P. G. T. Beauregard

Units involved
Army of the Tennessee; Army of the Ohio	Army of Mississippi

Strength
66,812: Army of TN: 48,894; Army of OH: 17,918	44,699

Casualties and losses
13,047: 1,754 killed; 8,408 wounded; 2,885 captured/missing	10,699: 1,728 killed; 8,012 wounded; 959 captured/missing
- Location within Tennessee

The Battle of Shiloh, also known as the Battle of Pittsburg Landing, was a major battle in the American Civil War fought on April 6–7, 1862. The fighting took place in southwestern Tennessee, which was part of the war's western theater. The battlefield is located between a small, undistinguished church named Shiloh and Pittsburg Landing on the Tennessee River. Two Union armies combined to defeat the Confederate Army of Mississippi. Major General Ulysses S. Grant was the Union commander, while General Albert Sidney Johnston was the Confederate commander until his battlefield death, when he was replaced by his second-in-command, General P. G. T. Beauregard.

The Confederate army hoped to defeat Grant's Army of the Tennessee before it could be reinforced and resupplied. Although it made considerable gains with a surprise attack on the first day of the battle, Johnston was mortally wounded and Grant's army was not eliminated. Overnight, Grant's Army of the Tennessee was reinforced by one of its divisions stationed farther north, and was also joined by portions of the Army of the Ohio, under the command of Major General Don Carlos Buell. The Union forces conducted an unexpected counterattack in the morning, which reversed the Confederate gains of the previous day. The exhausted Confederate army withdrew further south, and a modest Union pursuit started and ended on the next day.

Though victorious, the Union army had around 2,500 more casualties than the Confederates (mostly a difference in the number captured). After the lengthy Union casualty list became known, Grant was heavily criticized; decisions made by both the Federal and Confederate high command were afterward questioned by individuals on and off the battlefield. The battle was the costliest engagement of the Civil War up to that point, and its nearly 24,000 casualties made it one of the bloodiest battles of the entire war.

== Background and plans ==
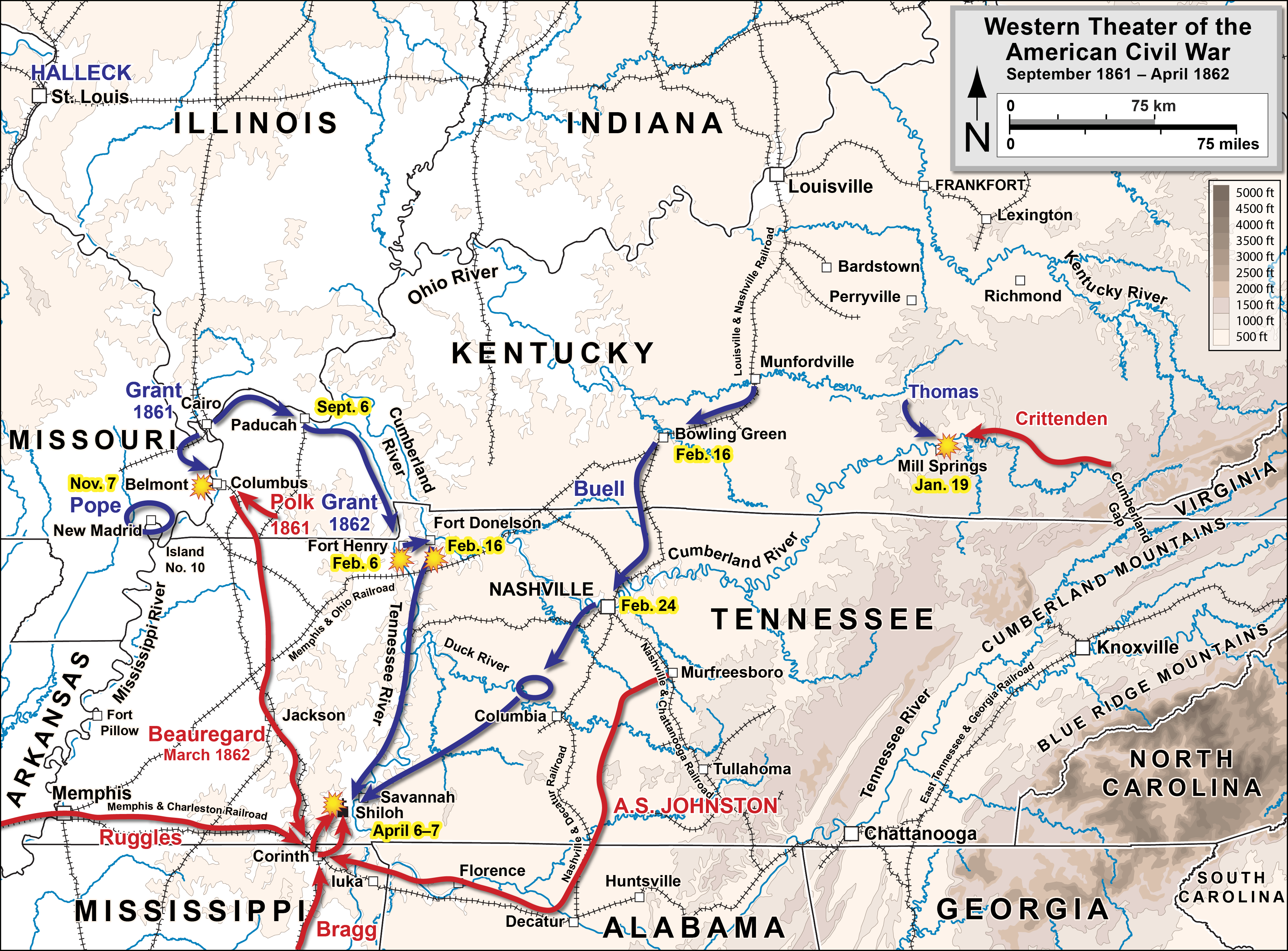
Defeats in February 1862 caused Confederate forces to consolidate in Corinth, Mississippi

During February 1862, a Union army led by Ulysses S. Grant won two battles that were the most significant Union victories, at that time, of the American Civil War. The battles were the Battle of Fort Henry and the Battle of Fort Donelson, and they occurred in Tennessee on the Tennessee River and the Cumberland River, respectively. Those rivers were vital to the Confederacy as transportation routes, and also connected the city of Nashville, an ironworks, and major agricultural areas. Nashville was a converging point for railroads, a major producer of gunpowder, and a major supply depot. The Union army increased its firepower in those battles by receiving assistance from U.S. Navy gunboats. The steam-powered gunboats were flat-bottomed, armored, and carried up to 13 artillery pieces. Grant was rewarded for his success by a promotion to major general, making him senior to all generals in the western theater (between the Appalachian Mountains and Mississippi River) with the exception of Major General Henry Halleck.

Continuing their push into Confederate territory, Union troops arrived at the Tennessee River town of Savannah, Tennessee, on March 11. By mid-March, a large number of Union troops were camped there and at landings further south, and additional Union troops under the command of Don Carlos Buell were moving from Nashville to join the force on the river. Union leadership realized that its troops were too spread out, so it was decided to concentrate troops at Pittsburg Landing. Pittsburg Landing is nine miles (14 km) upriver (south) of Savannah, and it had a road that led to Corinth, Mississippi. About three miles (4.8 km) inland from the landing was a log church named Shiloh (a Hebrew word meaning "place of peace"), and it is from this church that the battle gets its name. The battle has also been called the Battle of Pittsburg Landing. (Note: The Confederacy named the battle after the small church named Shiloh that was located near the position of the initial attack. Union historians initially named the battle after Pittsburg Landing, which is the point defended by the Union army. In the case of this battle, historians on both sides eventually began using the Confederate name.) The area that would become the Shiloh battlefield was somewhat shaped like a triangle, with the sides formed by various creeks and the Tennessee River. The land was mostly wooded, with scattered cotton fields, peach orchards, and a few small structures.

The Confederate Army's February 6 casualties at Fort Henry caused it to abandon Kentucky and parts of Tennessee. The last Confederate troops in Nashville moved south on February 23. General Albert Sidney Johnston, Confederate commander of the western theater, made the controversial decision to abandon the region. Although Confederate politicians were unhappy with Johnston's performance and the abandonment, the consolidation of troops further south was a wise choice, because the Union forces on the Tennessee River could cut off Confederate retreats from posts in Kentucky and major portions of Tennessee. Confederate leadership decided to consolidate forces in Corinth, Mississippi, which is just south of the Tennessee–Mississippi border. The town of Corinth had strategic value because it was at the intersection of two railroads, including one that was part of the rail network used to move Confederate supplies and troops between Tennessee and Virginia. By the end of March, over 40,000 Confederate troops were concentrated at Corinth.

=== Union and Confederate plans ===
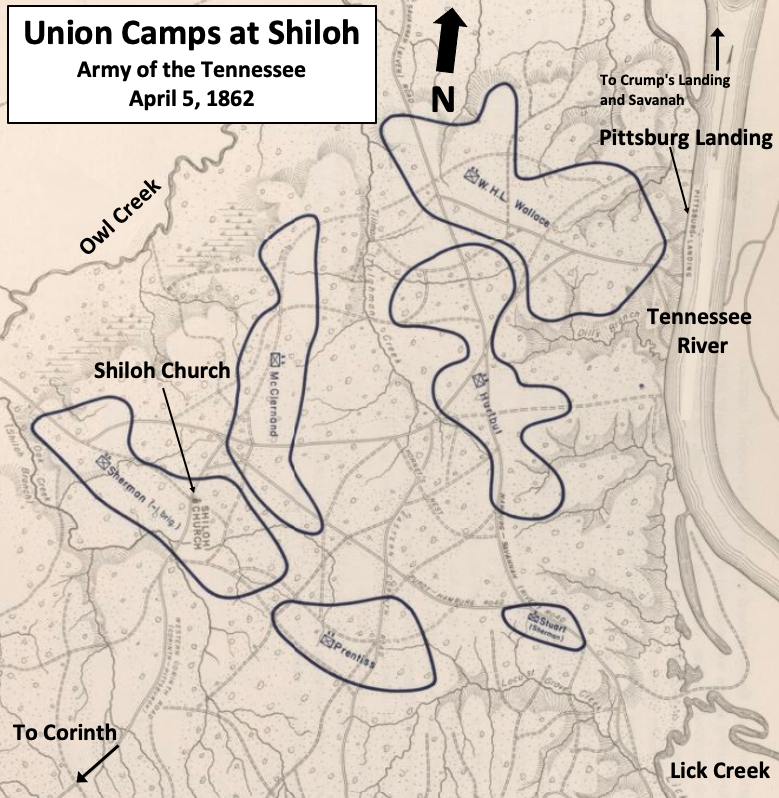
Union camps at Shiloh

The Union plan was to combine Grant's and Buell's armies and continue its southward offensive. If the combined armies could move south and capture Corinth, they would have a good starting point for the capture of Memphis, Vicksburg, and large portions of Confederate territory. While most of Grant's army camped near the river at Pittsburg Landing in early April, one division was five miles (8.0 km) downstream (north) at Crump's Landing, and army headquarters remained further north in Savannah. Buell's army was moving south from Nashville to Savannah, and no advancement beyond the Pittsburg Landing-Shiloh area was allowed until the two armies combined. (Note: The Union army move from Nashville to Savannah was delayed by the slow construction of a bridge across the Duck River at Columbia. Eventually, one division forded the river before the bridge was completed, and that division would be the first to arrive in Savannah.) On April 4, Confederate cavalry was seen by a Union patrol near Shiloh, but Union leadership was not concerned.

Confederate leaders realized they could soon be outnumbered. They had 42,000 men at Corinth, and 15,000 more on the way, while the not–yet–combined Union force could be as large as 75,000 men. (Note: A small Confederate army of 15,000 men, led by Major General Earl Van Dorn, was ordered to Corinth—but did not arrive in time for the Battle of Shiloh.) Instead of waiting to be attacked by a larger force, they decided to surprise the Union Army on April 4 before the second Union Army arrived from Nashville. Inexperience and bad weather caused their 20-mile (32 km) march north to be "a nightmare of confusion and delays", and the Confederate Army was not deployed into position until the afternoon of April 5. The army spent the night of April 5 on the south side of the Union campsites. The plan was to attack the Union left, pushing it northwest against the swampy land adjacent to Snake and Owl creeks. Confederate troops along the Tennessee River would prevent Union reinforcements and resupply.

== Opposing forces ==
=== Union ===
The two Union armies in the Battle of Shiloh were part of the Department of the Mississippi, which was commanded by Major General Henry Halleck. Although Halleck hoped to lead the two armies in an eventual attack on Corinth, he was not present at Shiloh. The combined armies present for the battle totaled to 66,812 men. (Note: The American Battlefield Trust uses a total of 65,085. The National Park Foundation uses "about 65,000".) They had 119 artillery pieces available for the battle. The majority of the Union soldiers were armed with either a .69 caliber model 1841 rifled musket or a .69 caliber model 1842 smoothbore musket, although a few regiments had more modern weapons such as the .58 caliber Springfield Model 1855. A few regiments, or sometimes a few companies within a regiment, had British Enfield or Austrian Lorenz rifles. The armies and their divisions were organized as follows:

==== Army of the Tennessee ====
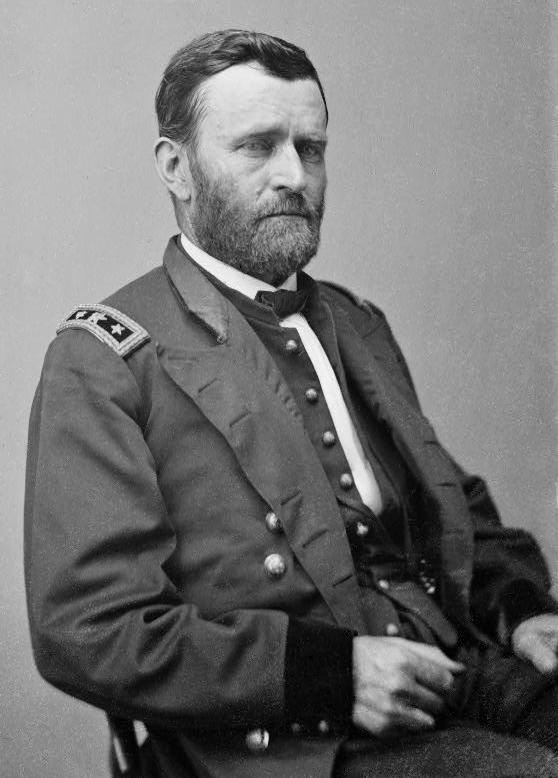
U.S. Grant

The Army of the Tennessee had the most Union men present at the battle, and it was commanded by Major General Ulysses S. Grant. In February 1862, a smaller version of Grant's army, with the assistance of gunboats under the command of Flag-Officer Andrew H. Foote, had been the victor in the Battle of Fort Henry and the Battle of Fort Donelson. (Note: Grant received national attention after the two victories in Tennessee. The jealous Major General Halleck attempted to "knock him down" by using untrue accusations of excess drinking and neglect of reports. Grant was removed from command on March 4 and replaced by Major General Charles F. Smith, less than three weeks after achieving the greatest Union victory (at that time) of the war. After President Abraham Lincoln indirectly requested backup for the accusations against Grant, and Halleck received a promotion on March 11, Halleck stated that Grant had never been insubordinate and restored him to command. Grant arrived in Savannah on March 17 to reassume command.) For the Battle of Shiloh, Grant's army had 48,894 men in six divisions. Two new divisions (4th and 5th) were added to Grant's three in early March. A 6th Division was created from reinforcement units at the beginning of April. The divisions (and gunboats) were as follows:

- 1st Division was commanded by Major General John Alexander McClernand. This division consisted of veteran fighters.
- 2nd Division was commanded by Brigadier General William H. L. Wallace. His men were veterans, but Wallace had been newly appointed commander after an injury to Major General Charles F. Smith. Colonel James M. Tuttle, one of the brigade commanders, eventually led this division.
- 3rd Division was commanded by Major General Lew Wallace. Many of the men in this division were veteran fighters.
- 4th Division was commanded by Brigadier General Stephen A. Hurlbut. This division contained a mixture of veterans and new soldiers.
- 5th Division was commanded by Brigadier General William Tecumseh Sherman. This division had little combat experience. However, when the attack at Shiloh began, Sherman was the only Union division commander on the battlefield who had been trained at the United States Military Academy (a.k.a. West Point).
- 6th Division was commanded by Brigadier General Benjamin M. Prentiss. This division did not have much combat experience.
- Two U.S. Navy gunboats were used by Grant in the battle. These boats were timberclads—their armor was five inches (13 cm) thick oak wood. The USS Tyler was commanded by Lieutenant William Gwin. The USS Lexington was commanded by Lieutenant James W. Shirk. Both boats and their commanders had participated in the Battle of Fort Henry and the Battle of Fort Donelson.

==== Army of the Ohio ====
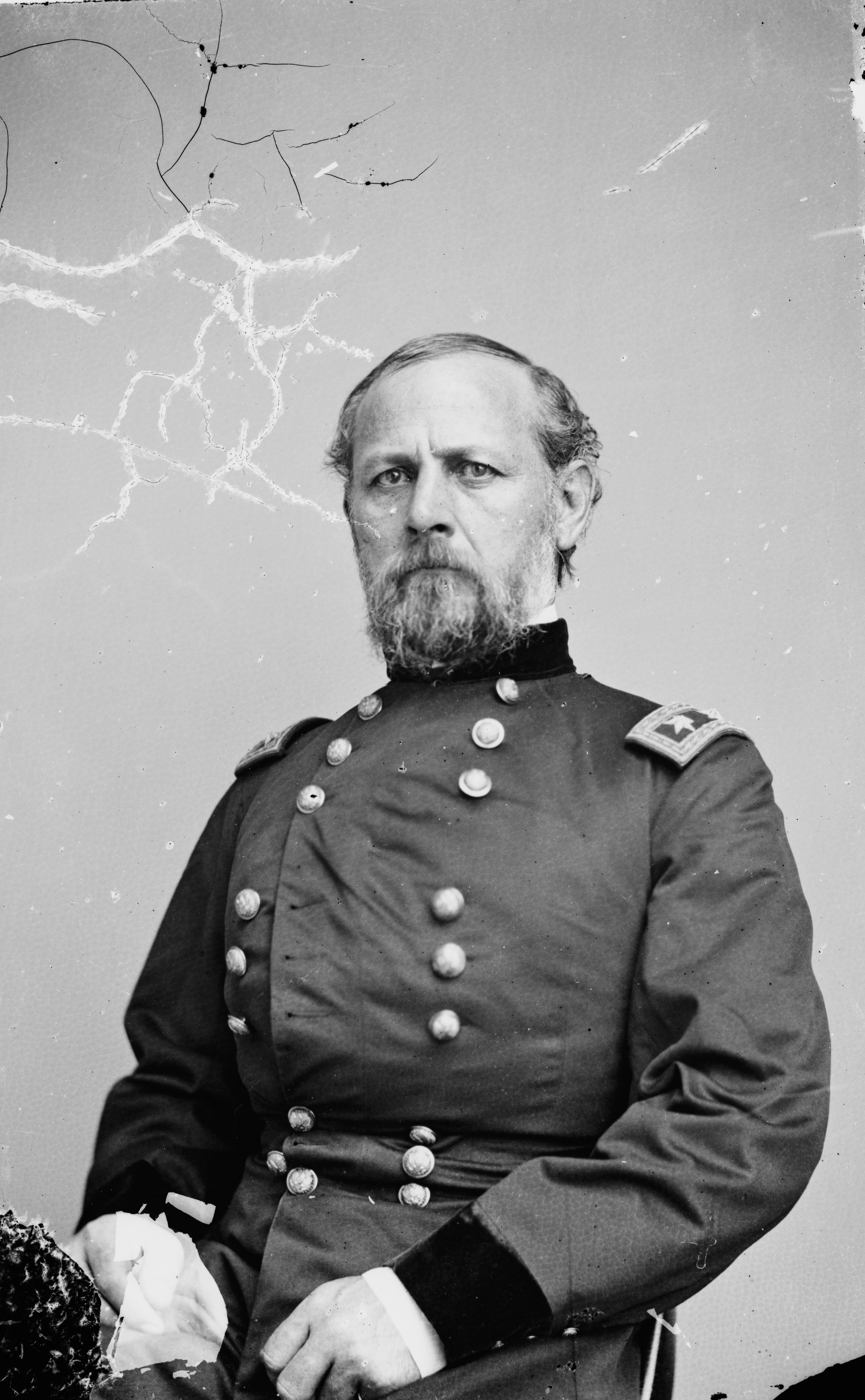
Don C. Buell

The other Union army at the Battle of Shiloh was the Army of the Ohio, which was commanded by Major General Don Carlos Buell. Portions of this army did not participate in the battle. One portion remained in Nashville, and another portion moved toward Murfreesboro and northern Alabama. Another division, plus part of a second one, did not arrive in time to participate in the battle. The number of men present at the battle totaled to 17,918. Although none of the regiments in Buell's army had participated in a major battle, all were well-trained and well-equipped. The divisions in the battle were:

- 2nd Division was commanded by Brigadier General Alexander McDowell McCook.
- 4th Division was commanded by Brigadier General William "Bull" Nelson.
- 5th Division was commanded by Brigadier General Thomas L. Crittenden.
- 6th Division was commanded by Brigadier General Thomas J. Wood. Only his brigades commanded by Brigadier General James A. Garfield and Colonel George D. Wagner arrived in time for the battle, and they were in place around 2:00 pm on the second day. The 57th Indiana Infantry Regiment was detached from Wagner's brigade to Hurlbut's division (Grant), and it was the only regiment to engage with the enemy and receive casualties.

=== Confederate ===
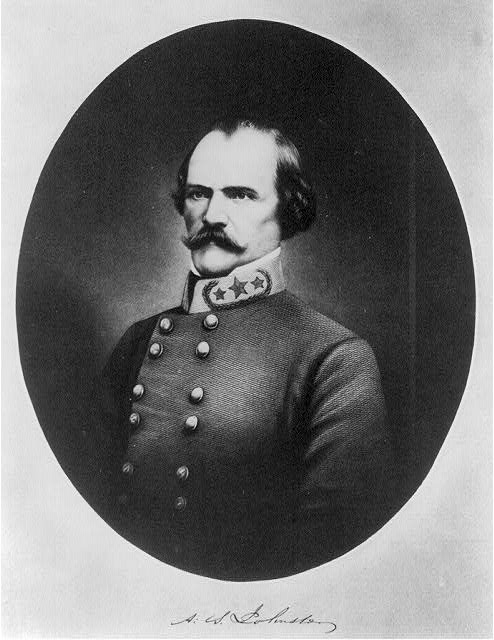
Albert Sidney Johnston

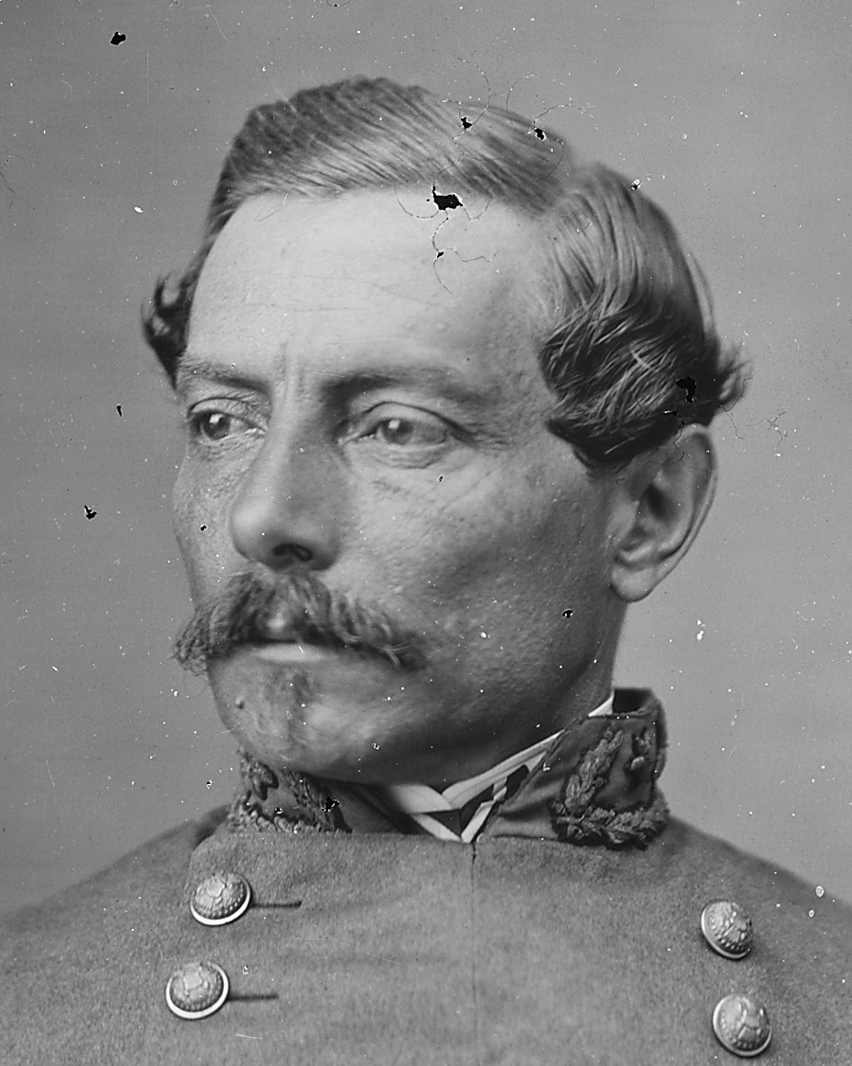
P.G.T. Beauregard

The Confederate army at the Battle of Shiloh was the Army of Mississippi, commanded by General Albert Sidney Johnston, with General Pierre G. T. Beauregard as Johnston's second in command. Created by combining the scattered divisions of Johnston's army with troops from Mobile and New Orleans, and later including one regiment that arrived on April 7, Johnston's army had 44,699 men present for duty. The army also had 117 artillery pieces for the battle. The forces at the battle were:

- First Corps was commanded by Major General Leonidas Polk, and consisted of two divisions.
- Second Corps was commanded by Major General Braxton Bragg, and consisted of two divisions. Although lacking experience in combat, Bragg's troops were the best drilled and disciplined Confederate troops at the battle.
- Third Corps was commanded by Major General William J. Hardee, and consisted of three brigades.
- Reserve Corps was commanded by Brigadier General John C. Breckinridge, and consisted of three brigades. In addition to the three brigades, this corps included some cavalry regiments and batteries that were not assigned to a brigade.
- An unassigned infantry force was the 47th Tennessee Infantry Regiment, which arrived at the battle on April 7.

Most of the Confederate troops did not have combat experience, and regiments were smaller than normal. Bragg's Second Corps was the largest of four corps, although it was smaller than the normal size. One of the reasons for the four small corps (instead of fewer corps that were larger) was size deception, as a typical corps had about 20,000 men. Small arms included flintlocks, shotguns, squirrel rifles, and percussion muskets. A few thousand of the highly accurate Enfield rifles had been distributed to Johnston's men before the battle; the supply of these increased as they were seized from Union troops in combat. Only one-third of the cavalry possessed any weapons at the start of the battle. Confederate cavalry was much more effective than their Union counterpart, and enabled Johnston to know the positions of both Union armies.

== Battle, morning of April 6 ==
=== Early morning ===
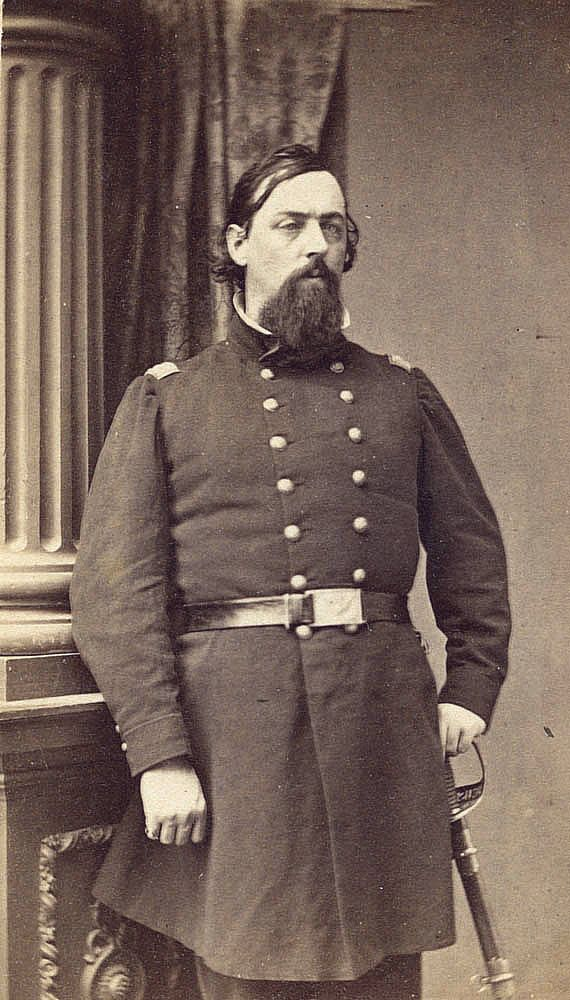
Everett Peabody

Early Sunday morning on April 6, five of Grant's six divisions were camped between the Shiloh Church area and the Tennessee River. Sherman's division was the first to occupy the Shiloh area, so his four brigades were camped near the main approaches to Pittsburg Landing. Colonel David Stuart's brigade was on the Union left (east side of battlefield) near the Hamburg-Savannah Road and a ford. To the west in the Shiloh Church area, Sherman's other three brigades formed the Union right. They covered the Pittsburg–Corinth Road and the Owl Creek Bridge over the Hamburg–Purdy Road. In between Sherman and Stuart was Prentiss's division, and between the Shiloh Church area and the Tennessee River were the divisions of McClernand and Hurlbut. To the north and closest to Pittsburg Landing was W.H.L. Wallace's division. Lew Wallace's division was at Crump's Landing, five miles (8.0 km) downstream (north) of the Union campsites. His mid-March mission had been to damage a railroad. While on this railroad raid, his men learned that a large Confederate force was nearby. Because of this Confederate force, Wallace's division remained near Crump's Landing. Grant was further north at his headquarters in Savannah. Nelson's division from Buell's army had reached Savannah, but Buell's other divisions were still marching.

The Shiloh camps did not form a defensive line, and no entrenchments were made because nobody expected a fight at that location. The inexperienced divisions of Sherman and Prentiss were the most forward (closest to Corinth) of the group. Only a few pickets were in place—despite a small skirmish taking place on April 4. (Note: Union Colonel Ralph P. Buckland was involved in the skirmish. Sherman dismissed the April 4 incident as a conflict with a reconnaissance force. Sherman, like the other commanders, had been ordered to be careful to not do anything that would start a battle before Buell's army arrived. He also dismissed more sightings and incidents on April 5.) After hearing reports concerning sightings of Confederate soldiers in the Shiloh area, Colonel Everett Peabody, commander of the First Brigade from Prentiss's division, became concerned. Around midnight on April 5, Peabody ordered Major James E. Powell to take three companies of the 25th Missouri Infantry Regiment, and two companies of the 12th Michigan Infantry Regiment, on a reconnaissance (a.k.a. scout) to Seay Field where the sighting had been made. Prentiss was not informed, and Powell's men advanced from their camp southwest down a farm road that led to the Pittsburg-Corinth Road.

It has been reported that contemporary Confederate soldiers at Shiloh referred to the brilliant sunrise on the day as the "Sun of Austerlitz," drawing a comparison to Napoleon's renowned sunrise at Austerlitz. This phrase is noted in several subsequent accounts derived from the recollections of those who participated.

=== Fighting starts at Fraley Field ===
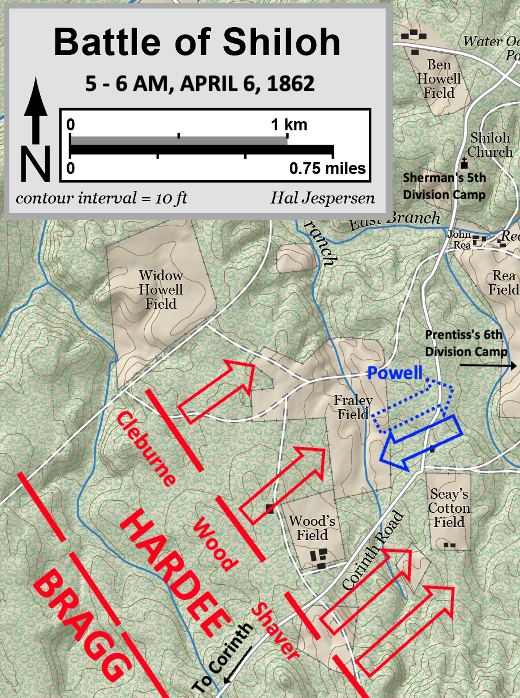
Powell found the Confederate Army near Fraley Field

The Confederate Third Brigade of Hardee's Third Corps was southwest of Powell's patrol. The brigade was commanded by Brigadier General S. A. M. Wood, and he had sent forward 280 skirmishers from Major Aaron B. Hardcastle's Third Mississippi Battalion. Hardcastle kept most of his men in the southeast corner of James J. Fraley's 40-acre (16 ha) cotton field, while two sets of pickets were positioned closer to the Union camps. Around 5:00 am (April 6), Confederate pickets fired at Powell's men before returning to the battalion. When Powell advanced within 200 yards (180 m) of Hardcastle's main force, the Confederates opened fire. The battle began with these two small forces fighting for over an hour.

Around 5:30 am, Confederate leaders heard the commotion at Fraley Field, and Johnston ordered a general attack. Johnston instructed Beauregard to stay in the rear and direct men and supplies as needed. Johnston rode to the front to lead the men on the battle line, and this arrangement effectively ceded control of the battle to Beauregard. (Note: Johnston was under tremendous pressure to perform well after the losses in Tennessee. He felt that he could make his army more effective by inspiring his inexperienced troops in person.) On the Union side, Powell sent a message to Colonel Peabody that he was being driven back by an enemy force of several thousand. Hearing the fighting, Prentiss soon learned that Peabody had sent out a patrol without authorization. Prentiss was outraged and accused Peabody of provoking a major engagement in violation of Grant's orders. However, he soon understood that he was facing a large Confederate force and sent reinforcements. Peabody's patrol, with Powell leading, partially ruined the planned Confederate surprise and gave thousands of Union soldiers time (although brief) to prepare for battle. Although Peabody's patrol had alerted the Union army, some Union leaders were not convinced that they were under attack. Sherman was not convinced until he was slightly wounded, and one of his orderlies shot dead, after a 7:00 am ride to investigate the commotion near Rea Field.

After Johnston's 5:30 order for a general attack, it took an hour before all Confederate troops were ready. Another hour was lost skirmishing at Seay Field (close to Fraley Field). This reduced the Confederate advantage from the unexpected attack. The Confederate army alignment was another issue that helped reduce the attack's effectiveness. The corps of Hardee and Bragg began the assault with their divisions in one line that was nearly 3 miles (4.8 km) wide. At about 7:30 am Beauregard ordered the corps of Polk and Breckinridge forward on the left and right of the line, which only extended the line and diluted the effectiveness of the two attacking corps. It became impossible to control the intermingled units, so the corps commanders decided to divide the battlefield, and each commander led their battlefield portion instead of their own corps. The attack went forward as a frontal assault. Johnston and Beauregard did not put more strength on the east side, which meant they did not focus on their objective of turning the Union left.

=== Sherman and Prentiss ===
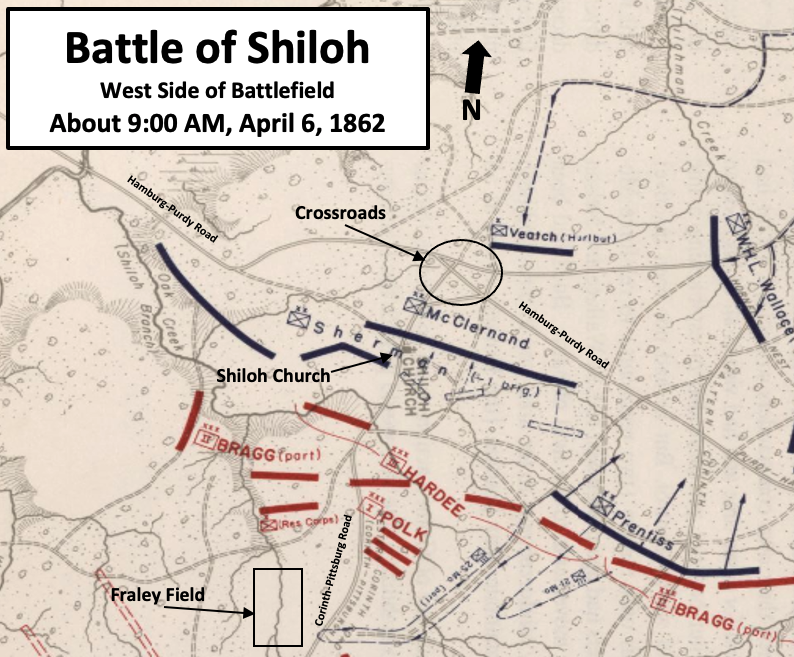
The divisions of Sherman and Prentiss were the first Union troops attacked

Sherman and Prentiss were the commanders of the first two Union divisions attacked, and those happened to be the most inexperienced of Grant's six divisions. Sherman, who had been negligent in preparing for an attack, performed with "coolness and courage" while he inspired his raw troops. (Note: Historian James M. McPherson cites the first day of the battle as the turning point of Sherman's life, helping him to become one of the premier Union generals.) Facing artillery fire and a frontal attack from the corps of Hardee, Bragg, and Polk, Sherman's men performed reasonably well—if they fought. The inexperienced colonel of the 53rd Ohio Infantry Regiment, which had just repelled two Confederate advances, yelled "retreat and save yourselves", and many from his regiment ran away. Eventually, at least two companies of the calmer men from this regiment attached to another regiment. Sherman slowly moved the division back to a position behind Shiloh Church. He became supported on his left by the Third Brigade from McClernand's division.

Prentiss had his camps northeast of Seay Field. On his right, his brigade commanded by Peabody was attacked by two Confederate brigades, and Peabody was wounded four times before being killed. By 8:30 am, the remnants of Peabody's brigade were pushed north, and the Confederate army occupied his camp. Further east, Prentiss's other brigade was attacked by brigades commanded by Brigadier General Adley H. Gladden and Brigadier General James R. Chalmers. Around 8:45 am, Gladden was mortally wounded from cannon fire. The Confederate troops suffered considerable casualties, especially from artillery fire. However, the Confederate troops pushed on, and captured the remaining 6th Division camp sometime near 9:00 am. The Confederate soldiers had seen many of the Union soldiers running away from the front line, and now possessed the Union camps of Sherman and Prentiss. Looting became a problem, as Confederate soldiers found clothing, rifles, and food. Confederate leaders found it difficult to control their forces. They paused their attack, which enabled Prentiss to move further north.

East of McClernand, Hurlbut had all three brigades ready for action at 8:00 am. After being notified that Sherman was facing a strong attack on his left, Hurlbut sent his Second Brigade, commanded by Colonel James C. Veatch, to assist Sherman. Shortly after that first message, Hurlbut was advised that Prentiss was in trouble. Hurlbut brought his remaining two brigades south on the Hamburg-Savannah Road near Wicker Field, and he encountered a large number of panic-stricken men from Prentiss's division who were fleeing north. Unable to stop the retreat, he settled his brigades further south near a peach orchard.

=== Pittsburg Landing and the Union left ===
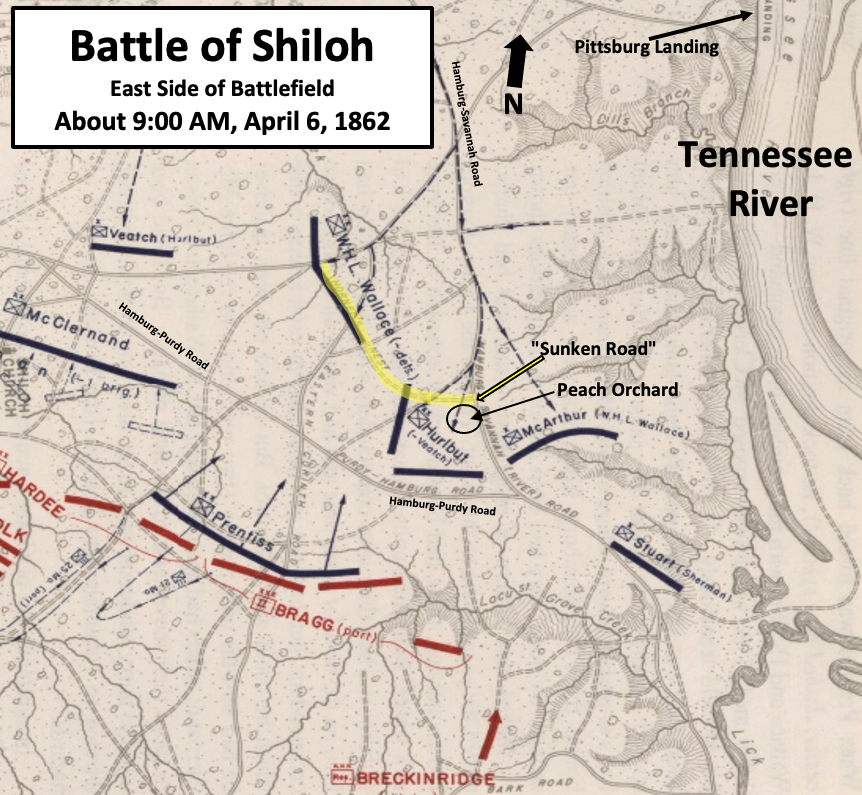
At 9:00 am, Stuart could hear artillery fire, but was not yet attacked

Grant was in Savannah having breakfast at his Cherry Mansion headquarters when he heard the distant sounds of artillery fire. He was on crutches as he recovered from a fall from his horse, and he was waiting for more of Buell's army to arrive in Savannah. (Note: Ahead of most of his divisions, Buell had already arrived in Savannah, and was walking to Grant's headquarters when Grant departed by boat for Pittsburg Landing.) Grant ordered Bull Nelson to march his division along the east side of the river to a point opposite Pittsburg Landing, where it could be ferried over to the battlefield. Grant then took his steamboat, Tigress, south to Crump's Landing, where he told Lew Wallace to get his division ready to move. Grant proceeded to Pittsburg Landing, arriving around 9:00 am. (Note: Sources have slight differences for Grant's Pittsburg Landing arrival time. Cunningham says around 8:00 am. Esposito says 8:30 am. Daniel and McPherson say 9:00 am. Chernow says Grant disembarked around 9:00 am.) The landing was beginning to accumulate men who had fled their posts, and Grant ordered a colonel to halt all stragglers. He then rode inland and confirmed that the Confederates had launched a full-scale attack instead of a probing action. He sent a message to Crump's Landing, ordering Lew Wallace to bring his division to the battlefield. (Note: This order would be the subject of controversy, as Lew Wallace disputed where he was told to go and by what route, and claimed the copy of the order was lost.)

After the beginning of the battle, Brigadier General W.H.L. Wallace sent his Second Brigade, commanded by Brigadier General John McArthur, to fill a gap on the Union left between Hurlbut's position at a peach orchard and Stuart's brigade at the extreme Union left. McArthur had only two of his regiments, since the others had been sent to assist Sherman and guard the Snake River bridge that led to Crump's Landing. His two–regiment force was bolstered by Battery A from the 1st Illinois Light Artillery Regiment. Wallace's First and Third brigades, commanded by Colonel James M. Tuttle and Colonel Thomas W. Sweeny, respectively, moved into positions near Duncan Field and what is now called the "Sunken Road"—between the divisions of McClernand and Hurlbut. From 9:30 am to 10:30 am, most of the fighting at this position was the exchange of artillery fire.

On the extreme Union left, Stuart's brigade had heard musket firing early in the morning, but did not believe they were under attack until they heard distant artillery fire. At 9:30 am Johnston received reports that Union soldiers were deploying on the Confederate right flank. To remedy this potential problem, he sent two brigades from Bragg's Corps, and called up Breckinridge's Reserve Corps. What his scouts had actually found was the camp belonging to Stuart's Brigade. Stuart was near the Hamburg-Savannah Road close to Lick Creek. Around 9:40 am Stuart began receiving artillery fire, and twenty minutes later his men were attacked by Confederate infantry.

=== Crossroads ===
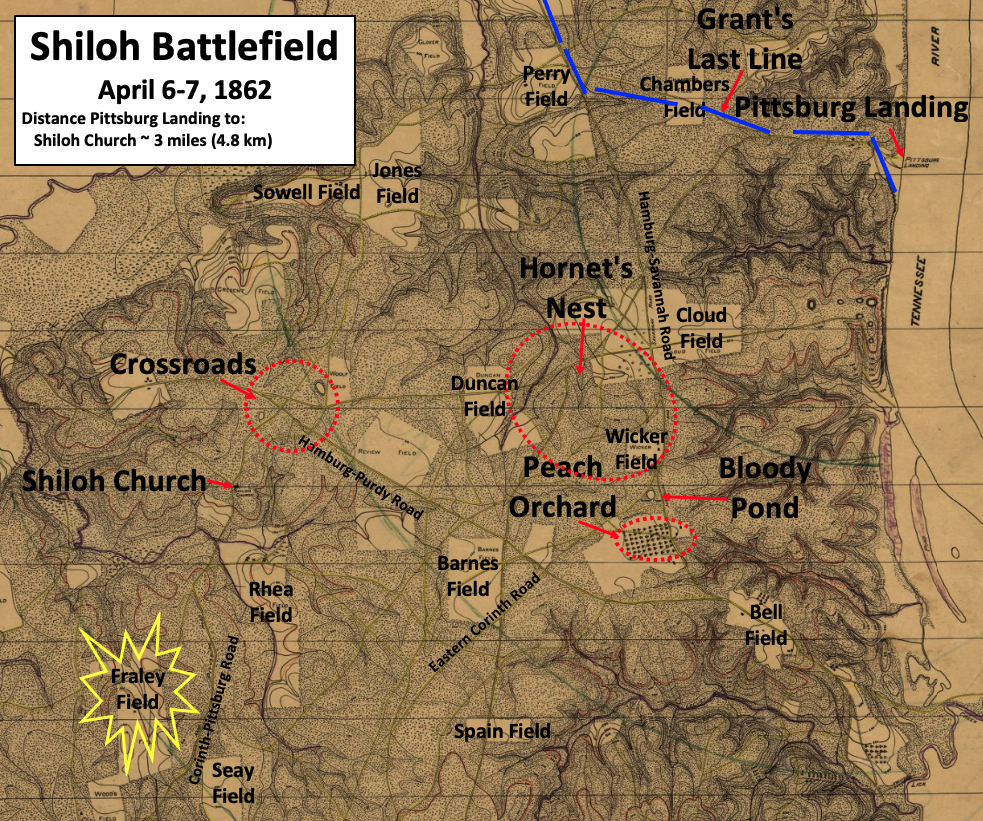
Topographical map of Shiloh Battlefield

Shortly after 10:00 am, the remnants of Sherman's division established a new position further north from Shiloh Church. This position was near a crossroads of the Hamburg–Purdy Road with the Pittsburg–Corinth Road. By this time, Sherman's Third Brigade (three Ohio regiments) was eliminated, as its last intact regiment ran away. Colonel Jesse Hildebrand, the brigade commander, remained on the field as a volunteer aide for McClernand's headquarters. Sherman's First Brigade, commanded by Colonel John A. McDowell was west on the Hamburg–Purdy Road and cut off. Colonel Ralph P. Buckland's Fourth Brigade was fragmented and ammunition was low.

Sherman prepared a defense with the men he had left, including Colonel Julius Raith's Third Brigade from McClernand's division that had reinforced Sherman's left earlier. Sherman also had the 6th Indiana Artillery Battery commanded by Captain Frederick Behr, and part of a battery from McClernand. For the first time, the Union army had a continuous front. From west to east were the remnants of Sherman's division, McClernand, W.H.L. Wallace, the remnants of Prentiss's division, Hurlbut, McArthur's brigade from W.H.L. Wallace's division, and Stuart's brigade from Sherman's division. Hurlbut was near a peach orchard, Prentiss was near the Sunken Road, and W.H.L. Wallace was adjacent to Duncan Field at the Sunken Road.

After a failed attack and the addition of more men, the Confederates attacked Sherman and McClernand again at 11:00 am. This Confederate attacking force consisted of portions of seven brigades. The Union losses in this attack included Colonel Raith, who was mortally wounded, and Behr's battery which fled to the rear after Behr was shot dead. On the Confederate side, Wood's brigade took heavy losses, but routed the brigade of Colonel C. Carroll Marsh from McClernand's division. Wood's men then defeated Veatch's brigade, but Wood was thrown from his horse and temporarily out of action. At that time, his brigade became scattered and disorganized. By 11:20 am, the Confederate army controlled the Hamburg-Purdy Road. Benefitting from the exhaustion and disorganization of the Confederate force, Sherman and McClernand fell back about 200 yards (180 m) north of the crossroads. Sherman's separated First Brigade (McDowell) linked with McClernand around 11:30 am.

=== Sunken Road and Hornet's Nest ===
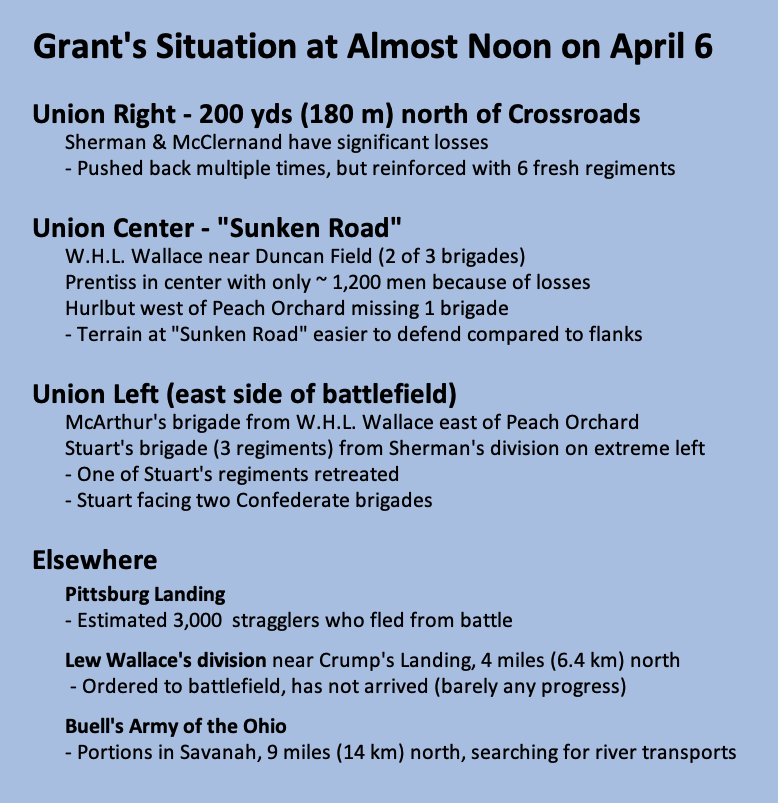
Grant's right and left were pushed back

The Sunken Road was an old wagon track called "an abandoned road" in the only time it was mentioned in the Official Records. From west to east, it ran from Duncan Field to a peach orchard (eventually known as "the Peach Orchard") at the Hamburg-Savannah Road. The old wagon track was so worn and washed–over that it had an embankment that ranged from a few inches (7.6 cm) to supposedly three feet (0.91 m). This ready-made entrenchment received the name "Sunken Road" in post-war years. Some historians doubt that the road was actually sunken. Nothing in the Official Records mentions it as sunken, and the soldier who wrote in his diary that the road was about three feet deep was in a regiment that was not close enough to the road to see it. When the fighting later became heated in this area—Duncan Field, the Sunken Road, and the woods on the north side of the road—the Confederates began calling it the Hornets Nest.

At the beginning of the day, Prentiss had 7,545 men present for duty. By the time he moved back to Barnes Field near the Hamburg-Purdy Road, after casualties and men that ran away, he had only 600 men and portions of two batteries. He deployed his men near the divisions of W.H.L. Wallace and Hurlbut, along the Sunken Road. Grant reinforced Prentiss with 600 men from the 23rd Missouri Infantry Regiment, which had disembarked from Pittsburg Landing a few hours earlier. Grant visited the 1,200-man force, and told Prentiss to "hold at all hazards".

The Union troops along the Sunken Road were protected by hickory and oak trees. Some Union troops at this location had modern (for 1862) weapons and fences for shelter, while some of the Confederate attacks were across open ground. These factors combined to make frontal assaults difficult for the Confederate attackers. One attack was led by Confederate division commander Benjamin F. Cheatham, and his Second Brigade was thoroughly repelled. Southeast of the Sunken Road, Stuart still held the Union left. The Confederate brigades commanded by brigadier generals James R. Chalmers and John K. Jackson attacked Stuart's three regiments. The intensity of the fight increased around 11:15 am, causing most of the 71st Ohio Infantry Regiment to flee to the rear. (Note: Colonel Rodney Mason, commander of the 71st Ohio, fled to the rear, and many of his men followed him. Lieutenant Colonel Barton S. Kyle was killed when he attempted to rally the regiment. After another incident that occurred in August 1862, Mason was cashiered.) Stuart repositioned his remaining two regiments, but eventually they began panicking. Although Stuart restored order, he was wounded and command temporarily fell to Lieutenant Colonel Oscar Malmborg.

== Battle, afternoon of April 6 ==
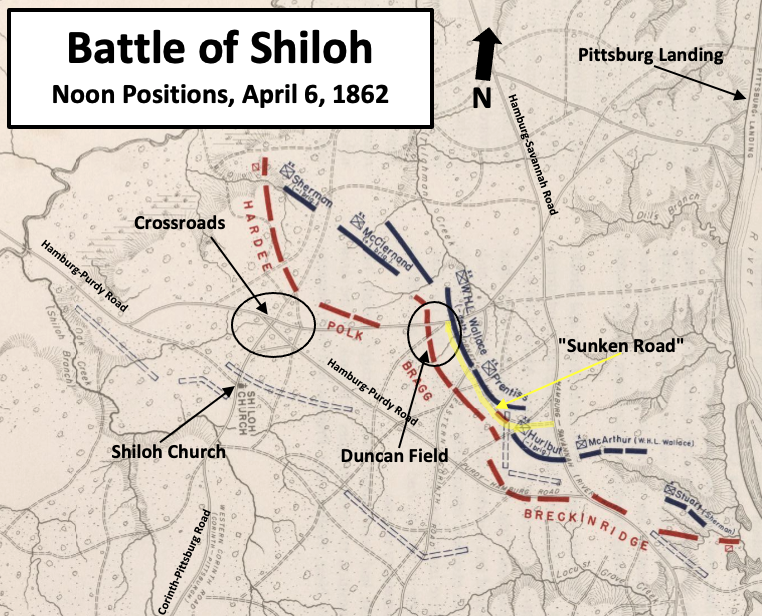
By noon, the Union right was pushed back and the left was threatened

Lew Wallace's division had made little progress following Grant's order to move to the battlefield. Early in the morning, his division had been spread as much as five miles (8.0 km) from Crump's Landing. The purpose of this positioning was to protect routes that would be used by reinforcements in case his isolated division was attacked. An additional messenger from Grant found him at 11:30 am, and Wallace did not get his division moving until noon. Another messenger found Wallace at 2:00 pm, and notified Wallace that he was on the wrong road. Wallace believed he was to reinforce Sherman and McClernand at their original camps—he was unaware that those divisions had been pushed back toward Pittsburg Landing.

By noon, Sherman and McClernand had been pushed back to Jones Field. However, the three regiments from McDowell's First Brigade had reunited with Sherman and McClernand, and three additional regiments arrived for reinforcement. McClernand's troops began a counterattack with the assistance of McDowell's brigade. The Confederates were pushed back beyond McClernand's morning headquarters, and both sides had numerous casualties. With reinforcements, the Confederate forces began a bayonet charge at about 1:00 pm that pushed McClernand and McDowell back to their original counterattack line at Jones Field.

=== Early afternoon ===
On the Union right, the divisions of Sherman and McClernand (plus Veatch's brigade) were a disorganized group of individual soldiers and portions of regiments. Many soldiers had dropped their equipment and headed to Pittsburg Landing. Still, Sherman and McClernand fought on with the remnants of their divisions.

The situation at the Union center was much better. Prentiss repelled multiple attacks by the brigade commanded by Colonel Randall L. Gibson. Captain Andrew Hickenlooper's 5th Ohio Independent Light Artillery Battery used shrapnel and canister to stop the first charge, and Confederate losses were considerable. After a third try, Gibson's brigade suffered enough casualties (including one colonel hit in the face) that most of the men fell back, and the brigade was not engaged for the rest of the day. Among the Union soldiers killed was Major James Powell, who led the early morning patrol that discovered the Confederate army at Fraley Field. While Prentiss was defending against Gibson, Sweeny repelled Confederate attacks near Duncan Field.

The Union left, even more so than the right, was pushed back. Stuart's two remaining Union regiments, temporarily commanded by Lieutenant Colonel Malmborg in the absence of Colonel T. Kilby Smith, made several stands east of Bell Field against two of Bragg's brigades. (Note: After being wounded, Stuart turned command over to Colonel T. Kilby Smith, but Smith left to find some missing men, causing Lieutenant Colonel Malmborg to have temporary command of the main force.) Fortunately for the Union army, Bragg's hungry men exhausted their ammunition and pillaged food from the Union camps instead of continuing the attack. Around 2:15 pm, Smith ordered Stuart's brigade to withdraw, and by 2:30 pm Stuart's brigade was done fighting for the day.

While Stuart was fighting, the adjacent position in the Union line was occupied by McArthur's partial brigade. McArthur's force was attacked around 2:00 pm by one of Breckinridge's brigades. Despite reinforcements, McArthur fell back about 300 yards north of the Peach Orchard where he stabilized his line 20 minutes later. On McArthur's right, Hurlbut's division was also under attack, causing it to fall back. Most of the attackers were from Breckinridge's Third Brigade, commanded by Colonel Walter S. Statham. (Note: Colonel W.S. Statham is often misidentified as "Winfield Scott Statham" instead of "Walter Scott Statham".) As the Union troops fell back, they would pause to shoot at the oncoming Confederates. Artillery was also used to slow the attackers.

==== Johnston killed ====
General Albert Sidney Johnston rode as much as 40 paces in front of Breckinridge's line. His uniform was torn from bullets in several places, and the heel of one of his boots was gone. After sending an order to Colonel Statham, an object could be heard striking Johnston. Although blood could be seen dripping from his leg, the general did not show concern. Shortly afterwards, he was slumping in his saddle. Asked if he was wounded, Johnston replied "Yes, and I fear seriously." Johnston bled to death from a torn popliteal artery in his right leg. Although a tourniquet might have saved Johnston's life, his personal physician had been sent elsewhere to treat the wounded. Johnston died about 100 yards (91 m) south of the Bell Farm at 2:30 pm. (Note: After Johnston's death, it was discovered that he had been hit three times in addition to his mortal wound. He was shot in the right thigh and left boot sole, and a shell fragment was in the rear of his right hip. Although it is uncertain who was responsible for the fatal wound, one group of Hurlbut's withdrawing Union soldiers claims they shot at an "obviously important" mounted Confederate officer, and men from Battery A, 1st Illinois Light Artillery believe a shot from their 12-pound howitzers killed Johnston. At least one source speculates that Johnston's fatal wound came from friendly fire.) He was the highest-ranking soldier killed in combat in the American Civil War.

With the death of Johnston, Beauregard officially became the Confederate army's commander. Some historians argue that since Beauregard was directing the army from the rear while Johnston was at the front, Beauregard already had the role of army commander. The Confederate attack on its right (Union left) stalled after Johnston's death, and many exhausted Confederate soldiers drank from what became known as the "Bloody Pond" located between the Peach Orchard and Wicker Field. The lull was caused more by the exhaustion and disorganized condition of the Confederate army than mourning for Johnston or Beauregard's lack of action. Beauregard sent Brigadier General Daniel Ruggles to coordinate an attack on the Hornet's Nest.

==== Union left and right ====
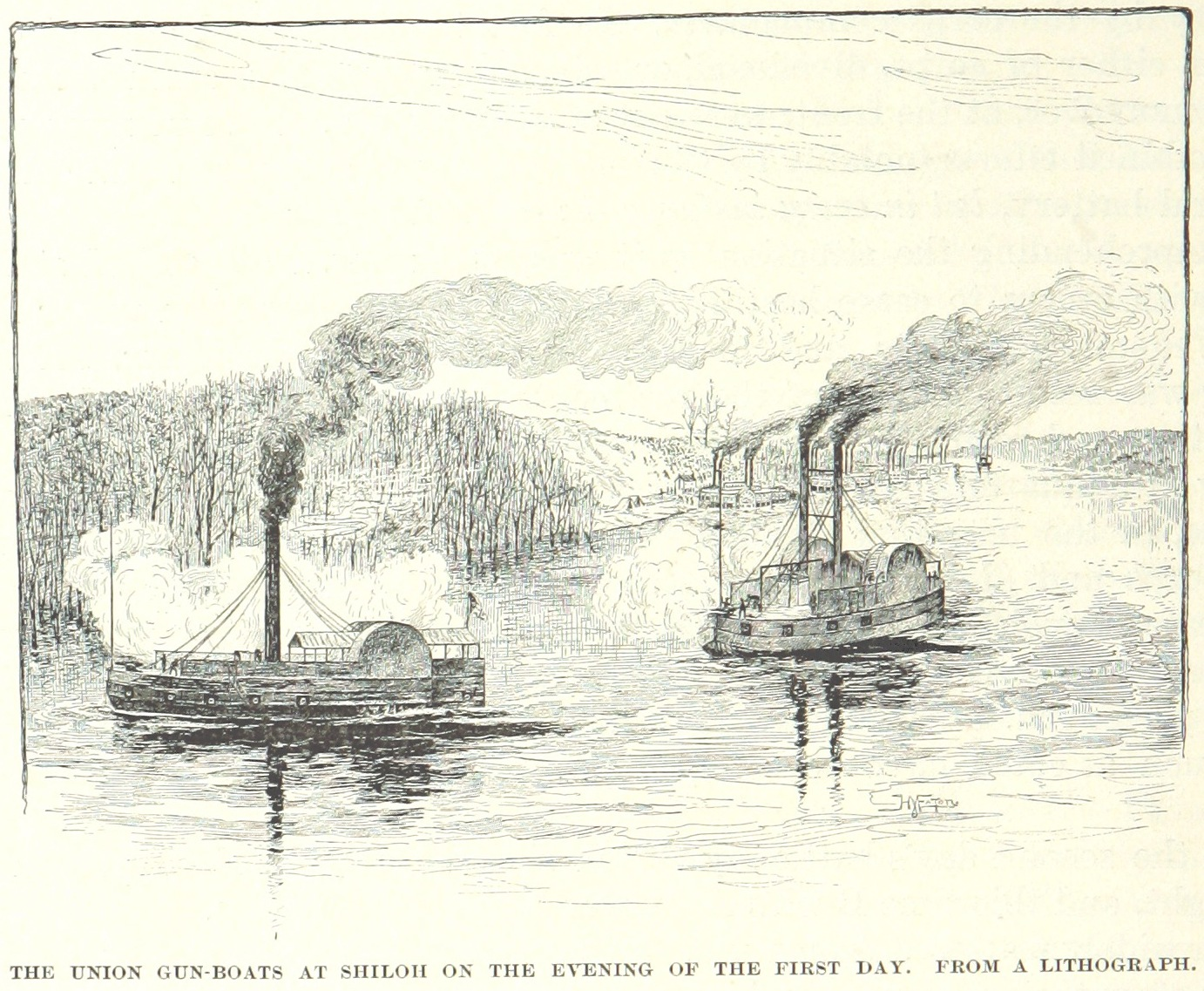
Union gunboats joined the battle

At 2:50 pm, Lieutenant William Gwin, commander of the USS Tyler, put his gunboat into action by firing on the Confederate batteries near the Union left. After an hour, Gwin was joined by the USS Lexington, and the two gunboats positioned themselves about three–fourths of a mile (1.21 km) south of Pittsburg Landing. At first, the shelling (gunboat shells were larger than those used by field artillery) had more of a psychological impact than a destructive one.

On the ground at the Union left, McArthur's partial brigade fought the Confederate brigades commanded by brigadier generals John K. Jackson and John S. Bowen. With Stuart now gone, McArthur was also getting outflanked by Chalmers's Brigade. Between 3:00 and 4:00 pm, McArthur moved all the way back to Pittsburg Landing. (Note: Daniel's map shows Hurlbut and McArthur moving to the rear at 4:00 pm. Esposito has McArthur falling back at 3:00 pm.) Hurlbut's line was also falling back, and only one regiment remained by 4:30 pm when Hurlbut ordered it to the rear.

=== Late afternoon ===
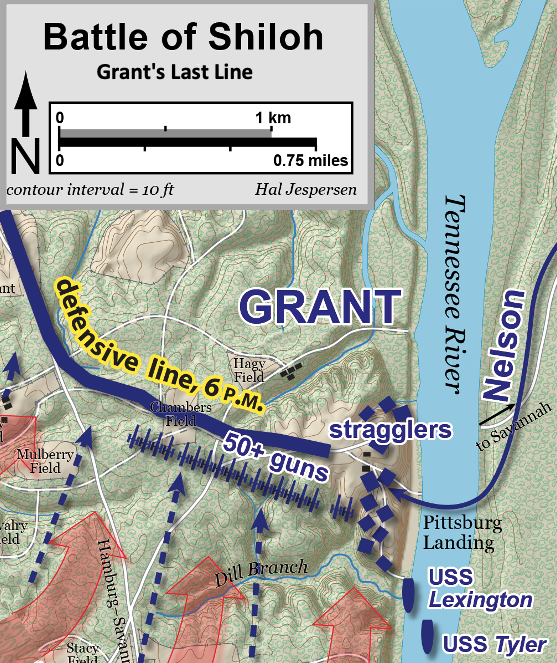
Webster organized Grant's Last Line

Sometime in the late afternoon, Grant assigned Colonel Joseph Dana Webster, a veteran of the Mexican–American War, the task of setting up a defensive position at Pittsburg Landing. Webster used stragglers and noncombatant personnel. He began rounding up artillery pieces, including siege guns and any batteries (or partial batteries) that retreated back to the landing. He eventually assembled about 50 artillery pieces, and they were positioned on a ridge on the east side of the battlefield. (Note: Sources differ on the number of guns (artillery pieces) positioned at Grant's Last Line, and this is discussed in a long footnote in Cunningham's book. Daniel says 41. Esposito says 50. Eicher says "more than fifty". Gudmens says 52.)

At the Union right, Grant visited Sherman around 3:00 pm, and found a difficult situation. The remaining regiments had few men, ammunition was low, and more men were either leaving or serving with other units. Some regiments had so many losses that they were ordered to Pittsburg Landing where they could reform. The Union line at this time was back to Jones Field and the surrounding area. The Confederate army facing Sherman and McClernand was reorganizing, and some of the units were shifted to the Hornet's Nest. After another attack at 4:00 pm, Sherman and McClernand fell back further around 5:00 pm.

On the Union left, Bragg tried to pursue the retreating Union soldiers, but was harassed by Union gunboats firing with increasing accuracy. The Tennessee River was near high tide, and the Union gunboat leaders had discovered that by elevating their guns and using lower charges, they could hit targets close to the river. The Tyler had some direct hits on Chalmers's Brigade beginning at 5:35 pm.

==== Hornet's Nest becomes focus ====
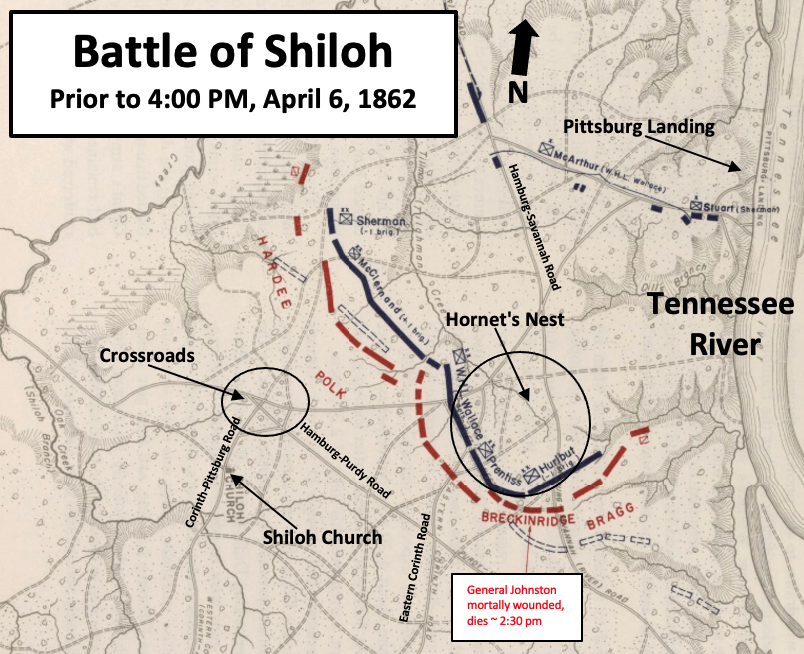
The Union right and left were pushed back

The Confederate army spent a considerable amount of time and resources assaulting the Hornet's Nest instead of bypassing it. Historians' estimates of the number of separate infantry charges, including those from earlier in the morning, range from eight to fourteen. (Note: McPherson mentions "a dozen separate assaults". Daniel criticizes "modern historians" who condemn Bragg for ordering 11 to 14 assaults, since Daniel accounts for only eight—including some not ordered by Bragg. He also believes flanking attacks on the Hornet's Nest should have been made earlier.) An estimated 10,000 Confederate soldiers were involved. At 3:30 pm, the Confederate army began moving all available artillery pieces into positions around the Hornet's Nest. Soon they had, at the time, the largest concentration of field artillery (over 50 pieces) ever on the North American continent. (Note: Historians do not agree on the number of artillery pieces in place. Eicher, McPherson, and Shaara cite 62 pieces. Cunningham says "a maximum total of fifty–one pieces". Daniel says "probably fifty–three".) This concentration, known as "Ruggles's Battery" was led by Brigadier General Ruggles. In his report, Ruggles claimed responsibility for assembling the batteries, but multiple people may have been involved—including Major Francis A. Shoup (Hardee's artillery chief) and Brigadier General James Trudeau. By 4:00 pm, the Confederate artillery was firing on Wallace and Prentiss in the Hornet's Nest. Confederate artillery was concentrated near Duncan Field and to the south near the Eastern Corinth Road. It was not until 4:30 pm that all Confederate artillery batteries were engaged, and at least one historian believes their effectiveness has been exaggerated.

Shortly after 4:00 pm, Hurlbut was gone from the east side of the Hornet's Nest, and McClernand had fallen back about a half mile (0.8 km) from the west side. Realizing that they were going to be surrounded, Brigadier General W.H.L. Wallace began leading his division north. Around 4:15 pm, he was mortally wounded as a portion of his division escaped encirclement. A ravine north of the Sunken Road near Cloud Field became known as "Hell's Hollow", and over 1,000 Union soldiers were captured there. By 4:45 pm, most of Wallace's division was removed from the battlefield, and Prentiss was left with about 2,000 men. Around 5:30 pm, various Union regiments began surrendering (including Prentiss), and approximately 2,200 Union soldiers were captured. In his memoirs, Grant was critical of Prentiss for not making a timely withdrawal. However, the Hornet's Nest stand by Prentiss and W.H.L. Wallace (who was there longer and had more men under his command) allowed Grant more time to prepare his Last Line. (Note: Daniels uses the term "Grant's Last Line" for Grant's defensive position in his map showing positions at 6:00 pm on the first day of the battle.)

=== Evening ===
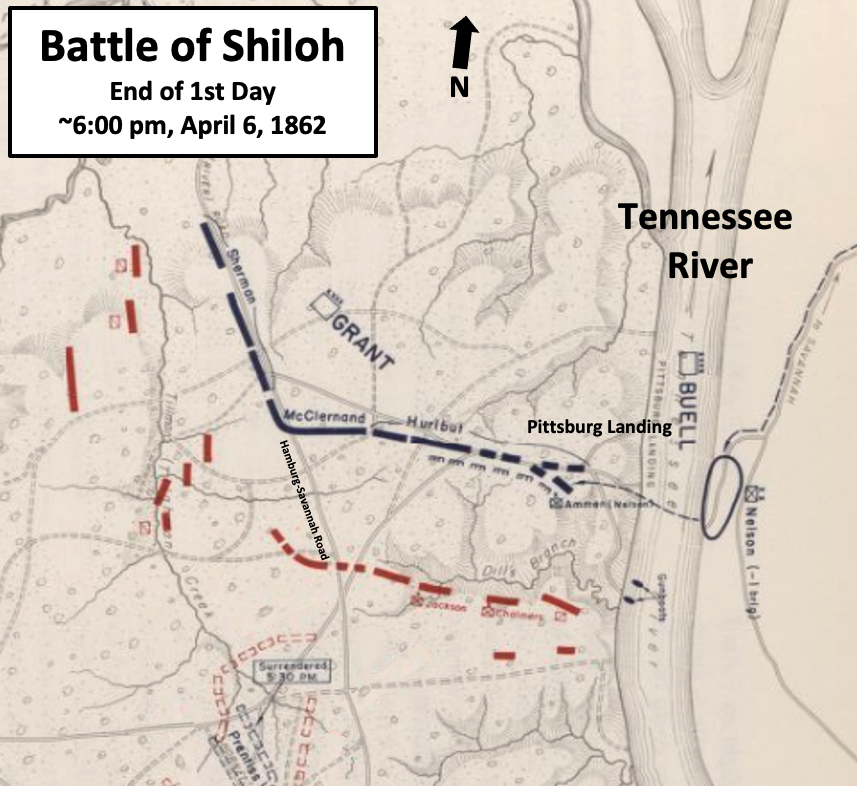
Positions at the end of the first day

By the time the Hornet's Nest fell, Grant's men had a defensive line from Pittsburg Landing to the Hamburg-Savannah Road and further north. Sherman commanded the right of the line, and McClernand took the center. On the left were the remnants of W.H.L. Wallace's division (commanded by Tuttle), plus Hurlbut's division. At the landing were 10,000 to 15,000 stragglers and noncombatants. The line included the artillery assembled by Colonel Webster, and the two gunboats were close by. Grant and Webster rode up and down the line, urging the men to keep firing at their enemy.

The advance of Buell's army, from Nelson's division, had begun arriving around 5:00 pm. Its 36th Indiana Infantry Regiment was placed on the east side of Grant's Last Line in time to help defend against an attack. The two navy gunboats helped defend, and the Lexington fired 32 rounds into the attacking Confederate force in only 10 minutes. (Note: Opinions vary on the effectiveness of the gunboats. Corps commander Bragg reported that the gunboat fire "though terrific in sound and producing some consternation at first, did us no damage...." Yet Confederate regimental commander Lieutenant Colonel Calvin D. Venable reported "...the shelling from the gunboats was so as to be unbearable, killing and wounding several of my men. I thereupon retired to a ravine and remained until dusk....") The Confederate attack was repelled, and shortly after 6:00 pm Beauregard called off all attacks. Buell and his army, and some in Grant's army, believed they had saved Grant's Army of the Tennessee. Grant had a differing opinion, believing that by 6:00 pm the Confederate army was worn out.

==== Beauregard's situation ====
When Beauregard called off all attacks, it was near sunset and he assumed Grant's army could be eliminated on the next day. He had received a telegram saying Buell's army was in Alabama, and did not know Grant was already being reinforced. (Note: One of Buell's divisions was in Alabama, but not his entire army. Late in the evening, a squad of Colonel Nathan Bedford Forrest's men discovered Union reinforcements arriving at Pittsburg Landing, and this was reported to Hardee. However, the rain and darkness prevented the men from finding Beauregard, and he was not notified.) The Confederate army was badly disorganized, and it had just finished taking prisoners from the Hornet's Nest around 5:30 pm. Attacks after dark were rare because of problems with friendly fire, and darkness would occur soon. The exhausted Confederate army already had about 8,000 casualties.

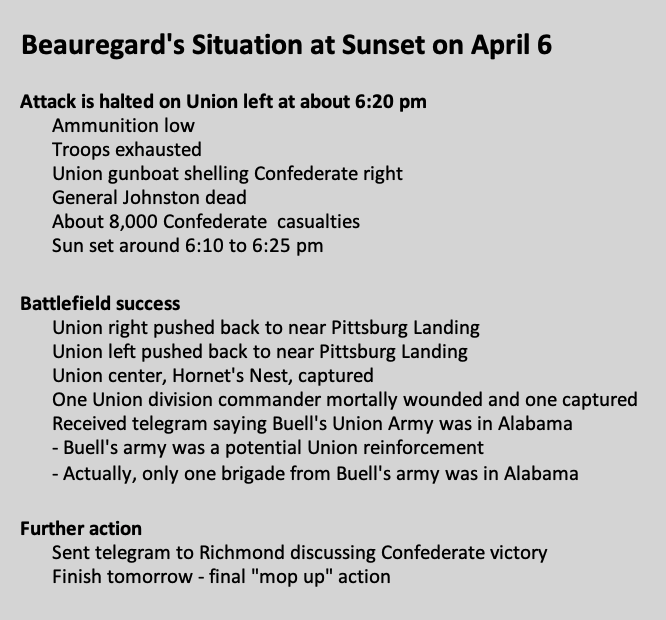
Confederate situation appeared better than it was

For many years after the battle, critics believed Beauregard had squandered an opportunity to finish Grant's army. Modern historians, such as Cunningham and Daniel, disagree with that assessment. Cunningham wrote that Beauregard's critics ignore "the existing situation on the Shiloh battlefield"—including Confederate disorganization, time before sunset, and Grant's strong position augmented by gunboats. Daniel wrote that the thought that "the Confederates could have permanently breached or pulverized the Federal line in an additional hour or so of piecemeal night assaults simply lacks plausibility." He mentions that it took the Confederates six hours to conquer the Hornet's Nest, and Grant's Last Line was a stronger position. He also cites exhaustion, low ammunition, and one staff officer's belief that one third of the Confederate army was plundering instead of fighting.

Beauregard spent the evening near Shiloh Church in what had been Sherman's tent. Most of the Confederate army moved back to the original Union camps. Beauregard sent a telegram to Richmond discussing "a complete victory, driving the enemy from every position." Many of the Confederate troops believed that the battle was essentially over, and spent time plundering the camps. Some soldiers took their loot and began walking back to Corinth. Some of the Confederate troops were now armed with better weapons than the ones they had at the beginning of the day. Austrian, Enfield, and Springfield rifles were taken from dead, wounded, captured, or fleeing Union soldiers.

It began raining at 10:00 pm, and at midnight the rain became a storm with thunder and lightning. This, combined with the constant shelling by Union gunboats throughout the night, made it difficult for the exhausted Confederates to get any sleep. Because of the exhaustion and the belief that Grant's army was almost finished, the Confederate forces were not reorganized. No plans or orders were made for the next day, and it was thought the various commands would regroup at that time for a "final mop-up action". The original Confederate plan was to push Grant's army away from Pittsburg Landing, and pin it against the northern creeks where it could not move quickly or get resupplied. Instead, Grant had been forced back to a defensible position at Pittsburg Landing where he could be reinforced and resupplied.

==== Grant's situation ====
Grant's army had 7,000 men killed and wounded, 3,000 more captured, and 10,000 men who were afraid to fight. Before being reinforced, he had an estimated 18,000 fighters formed on his Last Line. Since most of the Union camps had been captured, these hungry and tired men would have to sleep in the open without blankets, and rain and cold weather added to their misery. At 7:15 pm, 5,800 fresh troops from Lew Wallace's division arrived at the battlefield and were positioned next to Sherman. Brigadier General Thomas Crittenden's division from Buell's army began arriving at 9:00 pm, and two hours later the entire division was at the landing. Eventually, Buell would have nearly 18,000 men available for the battle. The Union line from west to east consisted of the divisions commanded by Lew Wallace, Sherman, McClernand, Hurlbut, Crittenden, and Nelson. Prentiss' division was effectively destroyed, and Tuttle was behind the line trying to reorganize W.H.L. Wallace's division.

Earlier in the day, Colonel James B. McPherson, Grant's chief engineer, asked Grant if preparations should be started for a retreat. Grant's response was: "Retreat? No! I propose to attack at daylight and whip them." Buell met with Sherman at sunset, and learned that Grant planned to attack at sunrise. An understanding was made that Grant would have the west side of the line, while Buell would plan his own attack on the east side. Despite Grant's seniority, Buell considered himself independent, and Grant chose not to consult with him that evening. Sherman found Grant resting under a tree around midnight, and said: "Well, Grant, we've had the devil's own day, haven't we?" Grant replied: "Yes. Lick'em tomorrow, though."

== Battle, April 7 ==
Between midnight and 4:00 am, Brigadier General Alexander M. McCook's division from Buell's Army of the Ohio arrived in Savannah. The first unit from this division to arrive at Pittsburg Landing came ashore around 4:00 am. Elsewhere, the Confederate 47th Tennessee Infantry Regiment was marching to the battlefield. This poorly-armed regiment of 600 raw recruits was the only reinforcement Beauregard received, and it did not arrive until 8:00 am. After deducting casualties and those who had abandoned their posts, Beauregard's Confederate army now numbered fewer than 20,000 fighters.

=== Union counterattacks begin ===
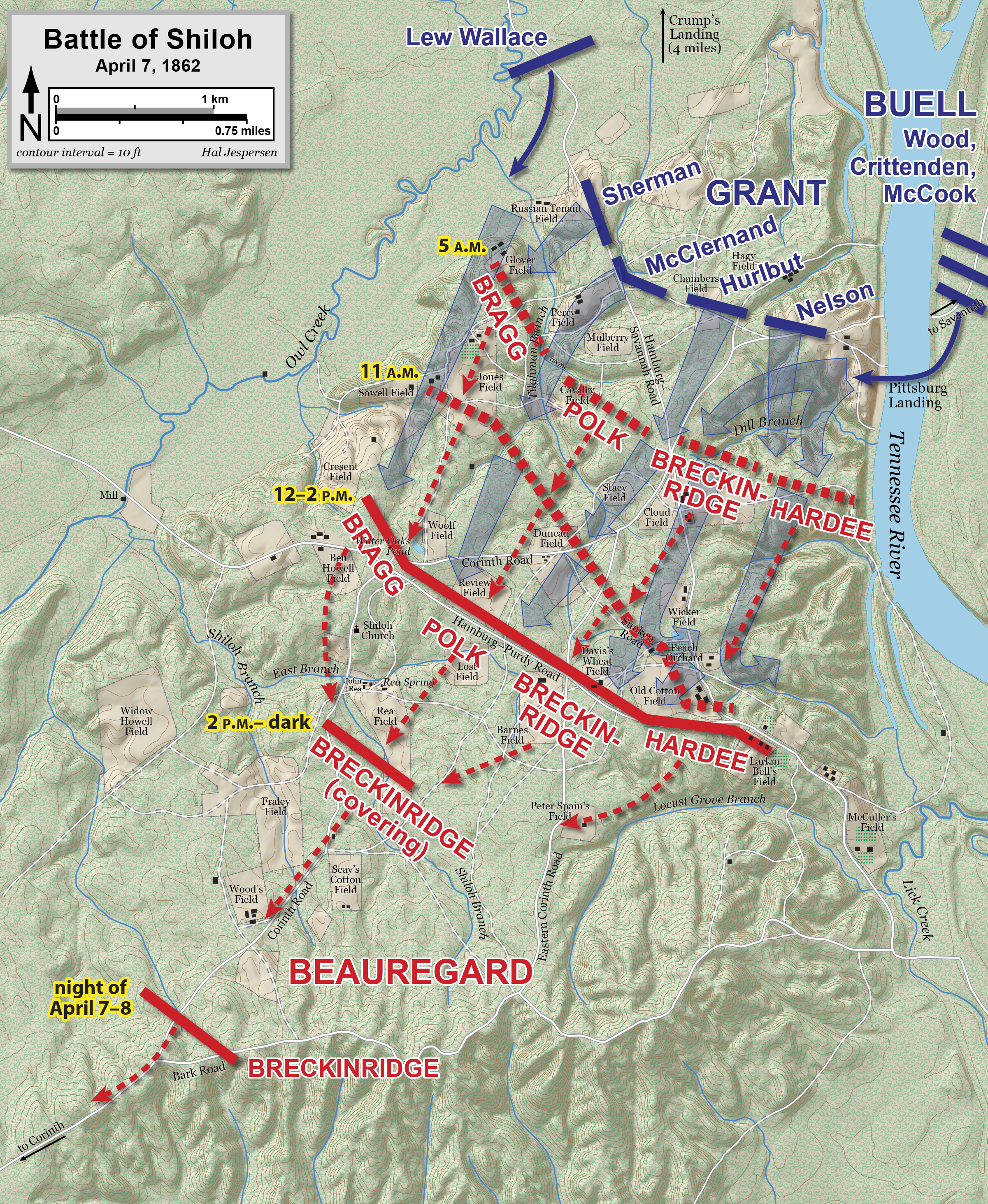
General overview of April 7

On the east side of the Union line, Buell's attack began at 5:00 am with Nelson's three brigades. A few hours later, Nelson was joined on his right by Crittenden. The two divisions advanced, dispersed enemy skirmishers, and were gradually joined on Crittenden's right by brigades from McCook's division. McCook did not have all three of his brigades available until close to noon. On the Confederate side, Hardee commanded the right that faced Nelson, with the division commanded by Brigadier General Jones M. Withers as his most organized force. The skirmishers that Nelson had chased off earlier were Colonel Nathan Bedford Forrest's cavalry regiment and small portions of Chalmers's Brigade from Withers' division. Behind the skirmishers were Chalmers's Brigade and a makeshift brigade of three regiments. A mix of regiments formed the line further west, and several batteries gave artillery support.

At the Davis Wheat Field, a small field between Barnes Field and the Peach Orchard, the brigade commanded by Colonel William B. Hazen, took more than half of the losses Nelson's division received for the whole day. More fighting took place near Sara Bell Field, and after three hours of fighting it became stalemated. Both sides withdrew around noon, putting Nelson back at Wicker Field. During this fighting, Hardee was slightly wounded, although he led a counterattack. West of Nelson, Crittenden and McCook advanced before being forced back to Duncan field. At noon, Buell's army had control of the Hornet's Nest.

Grant's attack began with Lew Wallace's fresh division driving Pond's exhausted brigade away from Jones Field. After a Confederate counterattack by Gibson and Wood, Sherman brought his division to the line and the Confederates were pushed back. McClernand and Hurlbut joined the fight, and all four Union divisions advanced at 10:30 am. At that time, Cleburne's brigade of 800 men took significant casualties when they unsuccessfully assaulted the Union force.

=== Afternoon fighting ===
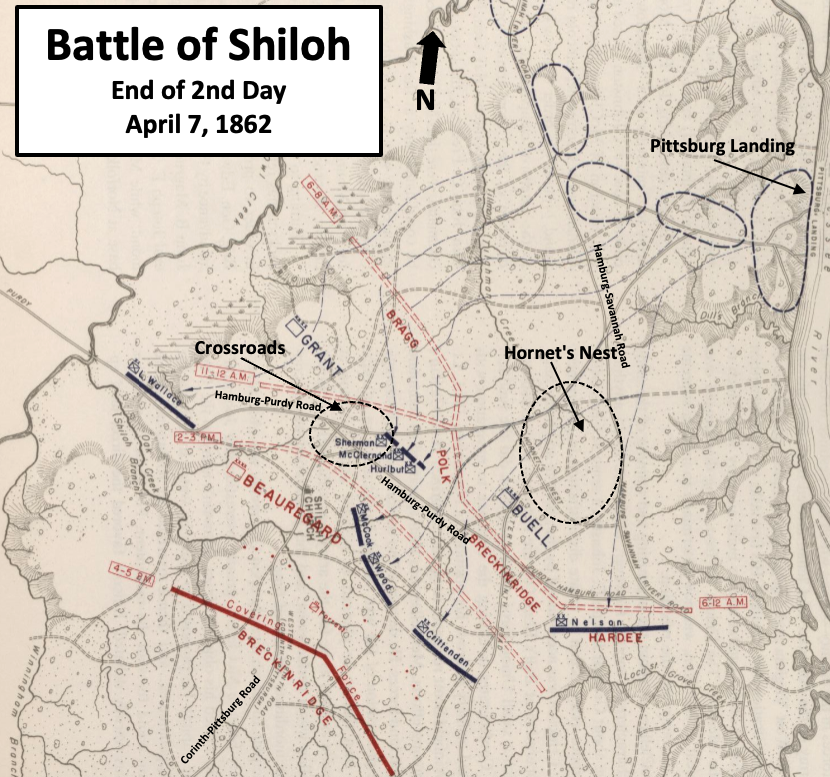
Positions at the end of the second day

Buell attacked again shortly after noon. In about two hours, Nelson and Crittenden reached the Hamburg-Purdy Road. Further west, McCook advanced westward on the Corinth-Pittsburg Landing Road, which caused a gap with Crittenden. The gap was filled by brigades from Grant's army that had been held in reserve. The Confederate army had held off Buell's fresh troops for a total of six hours, but their resistance was close to ending.

On Grant's side of the battlefield, Sherman and McClernand were stopped at noon when Cheatham's Confederate division attacked east of the crossroads and north of Water Oaks Pond. The two Union divisions were driven north about 300 yards (270 m). Despite light opposition at his front, Lew Wallace put his division in a defensive position, and did not resume the offensive until Sherman and McClernand had pushed back Cheatham's attackers. Bragg formed another line by Water Oaks Pond, and a two–hour fight ensued with Beauregard personally leading various Confederate units.

McCook's westward advance (instead of south), which began at 1:30 pm, meant that Bragg had Lew Wallace, Sherman, and McClernand on his front—and McCook on his right flank. After Bragg fell back south of the Hamburg-Purdy Road, Beauregard counterattacked using a force that was mostly Wood's brigade. Near Water Oaks Pond, this force pushed McCook back until McCook regrouped and repelled the attackers. Soon Beauregard and Bragg were forced back, and Union troops crossed the Hamburg-Purdy Road at 2:30 pm.

=== Beauregard withdraws ===
All morning, Beauregard hoped that the arrival of 20,000 men under the command of Brigadier General Earl Van Dorn would change the battle momentum back to favoring the Confederates. He was eventually notified that Van Dorn was still far away, so preparations for a withdrawal to Corinth began about 1:00 pm. (Note: One historian argues that Beauregard already knew Van Dorn was too far away, since he had been communicating with Memphis by telegraph.) At about 2:00 pm, Breckinridge began forming his corps into a rear guard position near Shiloh Church. Confederate batteries around Shiloh Church began a bombardment campaign to deceive the Union soldiers into thinking the Confederate army was still present. Around 3:30 pm, the last of the Confederate artillery was hauled away toward Corinth.

Grant and Buell did not pursue the Confederate army, and have been criticized for their decisions. One historian called this the "final Federal Blunder", and believed that Lew Wallace's fresh division should have been sent in pursuit. It started to rain at 6:30 pm, and the rain turned to hail as the temperature dropped. The battle was over with a huge number of casualties on both sides.

== Fallen Timbers, April 8 ==
At 10:00 am on April 8, Union forces commanded by Sherman and Wood began a pursuit of the Confederate forces. Breckinridge's covering force included about 350 cavalrymen commanded by Colonel Forrest. This group was a mixture of Forrest's men, John Hunt Morgan's Kentucky Cavalry, Texas Rangers, and the 1st Mississippi Cavalry (Adams' Cavalry). They were armed with revolvers and shotguns, and were instructed to fire only when they were within 20 steps of the enemy. On the left, two brigades from Wood's Union division skirmished with Wirt Adams' Cavalry Regiment and then returned to camp. On the right, a group led by Forrest attacked Sherman's men as they were clearing fallen timber near a small creek, causing some of them to run for their lives. Unofficial Union casualties were 15 killed, 25 wounded, and 53 taken prisoner. Among the few Confederate wounded was Forrest, who escaped after being shot at close range. Sherman ended the pursuit, and Breckinridge continued south.

== Aftermath ==
=== Casualties ===
Multiple sources list Union casualties as 13,047, with 1,754 killed, 8,408 wounded, and 2,885 missing or captured. Grant's army had 10,944 casualties, while Buell's had 2,103. Without counting those captured or missing, the brigades commanded by Sweeny, Veatch, and Colonel Nelson G. Williams all had over 600 killed or wounded. The report in the Official Records lists two brigade commanders as killed or mortally wounded, five wounded (including Sweeny), and one captured. (Note: A sixth brigade commander, Colonel Nelson Williams, is listed as wounded by one author.) One historian believes that the high number of officer losses caused casualty figures to be understated, and that they really total closer to 14,500.

Confederate casualties totaled to 10,699, with 1,728 killed, 8,012 wounded, and 959 missing or captured. Additional sources agree with those figures. The Confederate totals do not include reporting for cavalry or the 47th Tennessee Infantry Regiment that arrived for the second day of the battle. Similar to the understatement for Union casualties, one historian believes Confederate casualties were probably closer to 12,000. Using the commonly quoted statistics, Cleburne's brigade had 790 wounded and 188 killed, both numbers higher than those for any brigade in any of the armies at the battle. In addition to the wounding of Johnston (mortal) and Hardee (slight), Beauregard's report mentions six casualties for major generals and brigadier generals—one killed, three severely wounded, one slightly wounded, and one injured when his horse was shot. Another Confederate soldier killed was Samuel B. Todd, brother of President Abraham Lincoln's wife, Mary Todd Lincoln.

At the time, the battle was the largest fought in America and had the highest number of casualties so far in the war. The high number of casualties helped convince many Union leaders that the war was not going to end quickly in the west. About 20,000 men were killed or wounded at Shiloh, while earlier major battles at Manassas (a.k.a. Bull Run), Wilson's Creek, Fort Donelson, and Pea Ridge combined to only 12,000. Shiloh's total casualties of 23,746 (which may be understated) puts it in the top ten (6th or 7th) in the American Civil War. (Note: The American Battlefield Trust ranks the battles at Gettysburg, Chickamauga, Spotsylvania, the Wilderness, and Chancellorsville ahead of Shiloh. If the historian Eicher's casualties are used for the Battle of Stones River instead of the data used by the Trust, Stones River would become sixth-ranked and Shiloh would fall to seventh.)

=== Reactions and significance ===
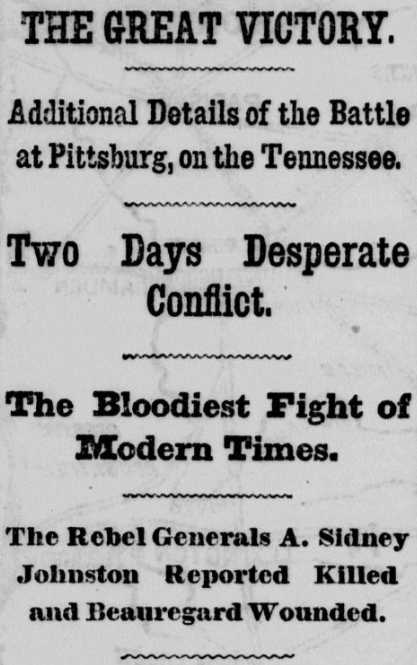
Beginning of early New York Herald article

Initially, news on the battle was positive for Grant. That changed a week later, especially when a "somewhat exaggerated" newspaper report by Whitelaw Reid (under a pen name) was released. Largely based on testimony from Union deserters and stragglers, the article said that Grant was surprised, and falsely claimed that Union soldiers were bayoneted in their tents. Only Buell, who according to Reid had saved Grant, was treated as a hero. Self-serving accounts from some of Buell's officers also swayed public opinion, and false rumors circulated that Grant had been drunk. Among the more justified criticisms of Grant was the lack of fortifications at the camps around Pittsburg Landing; one historian considers this a critical mistake. At least two of Grant's generals counseled against entrenching, and Grant believed that enemy troops would not leave their own entrenched position.

Lew Wallace received criticism for his inability to get his division to the battlefield in a timely manner, and he was eventually removed from Grant's army. His division should have been ready to move from Crump's Landing, which is six miles (9.7 km) from Pittsburg Landing via the River Road. Instead, he marched his division the wrong way, and the countermarch was delayed because he directed his original vanguard to move to the rear so it could become the vanguard when the division reversed its march. He may have also lost time by marching down a rugged path through cornfields and pastures. Critics also accused him of "dilatoriness", or slow procrastination. This portion of his criticism was unjustified since his men moved 15 miles (24 km) in six and a half hours—similar to the rate for Nelson's division. Grant wrote in 1863 that a different commander could have moved Wallace's division to the battlefield before 1:00 pm. Wallace spent the next few decades defending his actions. In 1885, Grant received a letter from the widow of Brigadier General William H. L. Wallace that had been written by Lew Wallace to her husband on April 5, 1862. The letter provided enough information about Lew Wallace's preparations and route choice that Grant felt Wallace was unjustly criticized—the route selection was justified given that Wallace did not know Sherman had been pushed back and orders did not specify which road to take. These conclusions appeared in Century Magazine in July 1885 and as a note in Personal Memoirs of U. S. Grant. Wallace's postwar life was more successful as an author, and he became well known for writing the best–selling novel Ben-Hur: A Tale of the Christ.

Some of the more "savage denunciations" of Grant came from politicians representing Ohio and Iowa—home states of many of the men who ran away when fighting started. One politician complained to Lincoln, saying Grant was an incompetent drunk that was a political liability. Lincoln's response was "I can't spare this man; he fights." Sherman, who could have been one of the battle's scapegoats and did not get along with the press, received more praise than criticism. Halleck praised his performance and requested a promotion for him, noting that Sherman had "three horses killed under him" and was wounded twice. Halleck arrived at Pittsburg Landing on April 11 and took personal command—as he had planned earlier. On April 30, he named Grant as his second-in-command. This was a meaningless position, but Halleck's solution to the Grant criticism was a de facto suspension that satisfied the critics.

On April 8, Confederate president Jefferson Davis reported to the Confederate congress that according to the latest accounts, Johnston had gained a complete victory. A last-minute addition to his speech mentioned Johnston's death. Before the battle, the public had wanted Johnston removed because of the loss of most of Tennessee. Now he was a hero. Over the next few days, more information about the battle became available. The initial perception was that only "untoward events" had saved the Union army from destruction, and the withdrawal to Corinth was part of a strategic plan. Eventually, critics began to blame Beauregard for the defeat, citing the lack of a twilight attack on the first day of the battle.

Confederate President Davis believed that the loss of Albert Sidney Johnston was the "turning point of our fate" in the western theater. With the loss at Shiloh, the likelihood of the Confederacy regaining control of the upper Mississippi Valley was severely diminished, and the large number of casualties represented the start of an unwinnable war of attrition. The victory at Shiloh also placed the Union army in a strategic position to infiltrate and capture key points in the south. Waiting until he was fully reinforced and resupplied, Halleck began a "painfully slow" movement to Corinth on April 29. Arriving on the morning of May 30, Union troops found the city abandoned. New Orleans, Baton Rouge, and Memphis were overrun by Union navy forces over the next three months. By July, Halleck was promoted to chief of staff in Washington, and Grant became commander of the now larger District of West Tennessee. Grant would go on to lead the Siege of Vicksburg, where nearly 30,000 Confederate troops surrendered on July 4, 1863.

== Battlefield preservation ==
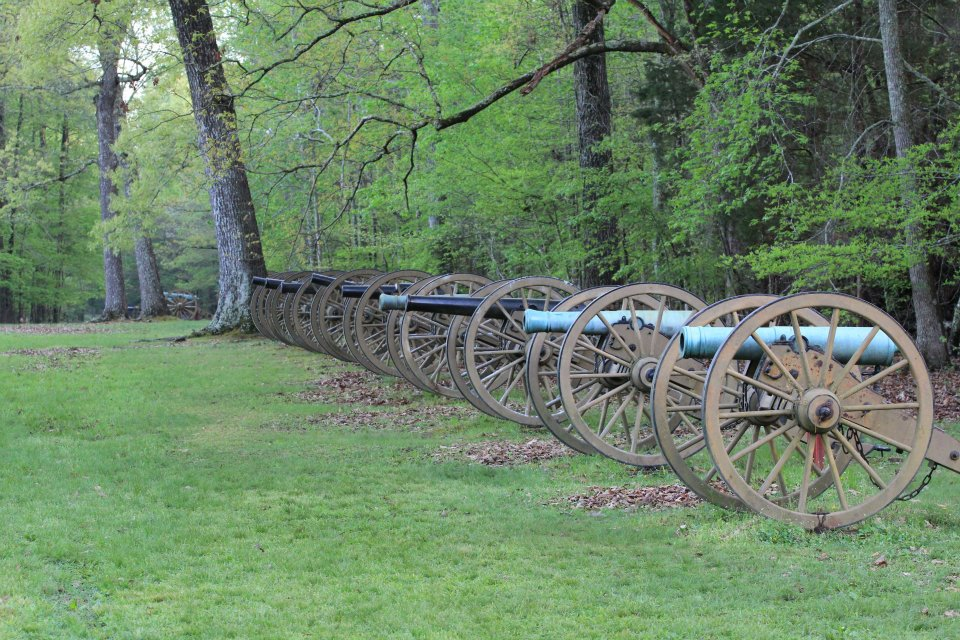
Ruggles' Battery at Shiloh National Military Park

The War Department established the Pittsburg Landing National Cemetery in 1866, and its name was changed to Shiloh National Cemetery in 1889. The Shiloh National Military Park was established by the United States Congress on December 27, 1894. Originally under the administration of the War Department, the park was transferred to the National Park Service of the Department of the Interior in 1933. The American Battlefield Trust, a non-profit battlefield land preservation organization, has been involved with its partners in saving more than 1,401 acres (567 ha) of the Shiloh and Fallen Timbers battlefields in 30 different transactions from 2001 to 2023. Sites such as the Bloody Pond, Hornet's Nest and Pittsburg Landing are part of the park. The Shiloh Church at the park is a nearly exact representation of the original, constructed using 150-year-old timber. Additional points in the park include Fraley Field, the Peach Orchard, Ruggles' Battery, Grant's Last Line, and the site of Johnston's death. In 2022, the park consisted of over 5,200 acres (2,100 ha).
