= Fort Union (Wisconsin) =

Coordinates: 42°54.978′N 90°7.084′W

Fort Union was a frontier fort at Dodgeville, Wisconsin, United States, during the 1832 Black Hawk War. It served as military commander Henry Dodge's headquarters during that war.

Wisconsin Historical Society marker

== History ==
Henry Dodge, who became known as a military commander during the Black Hawk War first located in Wisconsin in 1827 where he established a lead smelting operation. His settlement became known as Dodgeville and during the 1832 Black Hawk War Fort Union was constructed. Fort Union served as Dodge's headquarters during the war.
