= William B. Royall =

United States Army general

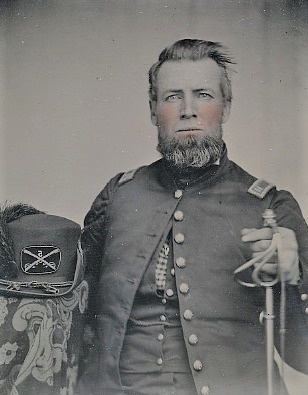
- Royall in uniform
- Born: April 15, 1825; Halifax, Virginia, U.S.
- Died: December 13, 1895 (aged 70); Washington, D.C., U.S.
- Burial place: Arlington National Cemetery
- Relatives: Sterling Price (uncle)
- Military career
- Allegiance: United States
- Branch: United States Army; Union Army
- Service years: 1846–1887
- Rank: Brigadier-General
- Conflicts: Mexican–American War: Battle of La Canada; Battle of El Embudo; Siege of Pueblo de Taos; Battle of Coon Creek; American Civil War: Siege of Yorktown (1862); Battle of Hanover Court House

William Bedford Royall (April 15, 1825 – December 13, 1895) was a Union Army officer during the American Civil War and later a United States Army brigadier general.

== Biography ==
William B. Royall was born in Halifax, Virginia on April 15, 1825. He led a group of mounted volunteers from Missouri during the Mexican War. He became a first lieutenant of the United States Cavalry on March 3, 1855 and a captain on March 21, 1861. Despite his southern birth and his uncle Sterling Price's decision to join the Confederacy, Royall remained loyal to the Union and served in the Army of the Potomac. After the Civil War, he served in Kansas under General George Crook. He retired on October 19, 1887, and died at his home in Washington, D.C. on December 13, 1895.
