= San Elizario Spy Company =

Former volunteer division of Confederate army

The San Elizario Spy Company or Coopwood Spy Company was an independent volunteer company of cavalry formed by Captain Bethel Coopwood and mustered into Confederate service on July 11, 1861 in El Paso, Texas.

== Organization ==
The company had four officers, eight NCOs and 36 personnel, some from California but most from the El Paso area. By the time it was attached to John R. Baylor Command in Mesilla, New Mexico on October 3, 1861 it had 61 enlisted personnel, the additional men recruited in the Mesilla area. On January 25, 1862 two NCOs and seven privates from the Company were detached to help form Sherod Hunter's Company A, Arizona Rangers, that were sent to occupy Tucson, Arizona.

== Service ==
The Company served in the Army of New Mexico during the New Mexico Campaign and fought in the Battle of Valverde, Battle of Glorieta Pass and the Battle of Peralta.

== See also ==
- Texas Civil War Confederate Units
- Texas in the American Civil War
