= Army of New Mexico =

- The Sibley Flag, battle flag of the Army of New Mexico
- Active: 1861–1862
- Country: Confederate States
- Branch: Confederate States Army
- Type: Field army
- Role: Main Confederate force in the New Mexico Territory
- Size: 2,515
- Part of: Trans-Mississippi Department
- Engagements: New Mexico Campaign

Commanders
- Notable commanders: Henry H. Sibley

The Army of New Mexico, also known as the Sibley Brigade, was a small Confederate field army in the American Civil War. It operated in Confederate Arizona and New Mexico Territory during the New Mexico Campaign in late 1861 and early 1862, before it was transferred to Louisiana. At first the force was tasked with securing Confederate Arizona's forts, most of which were still in Union hands. John R. Baylor had already established the Confederate Territory of Arizona after the First Battle of Mesilla in 1861. Now the goal was to capture the remaining U.S. held forts in Confederate Arizona and to invade New Mexico Territory. The army also hoped to capture the mines of Colorado and California, to secure gold and silver supplies to finance the Confederate war effort. Ultimately, the Confederate plans were thwarted at the Battle of Glorieta Pass.

== History ==
The army was formed by Brigadier General Henry Hopkins Sibley during the summer of 1861, recruiting from the eastern counties of Texas. Sibley had planned to use local militia companies in forming his regiments, but upon his arrival to Texas he found the militia to be unreliable, so he started recruiting from scratch. Two regiments were formed initially, the 4th and the 5th Mounted Rifles, both with a battery of howitzers attached, but a third regiment, designated the 7th Mounted Rifles, was formed to garrison the territory. The volunteers provided their own weapons, horses, and blankets, with minimal supplies given from the government warehouses. As a result, the weapons used by the troops varied widely, including rifle muskets, squirrel guns, and double barreled shotguns. After initial training in San Antonio, the regiments were sent by detachments to Fort Bliss near El Paso in October, where Sibley formally took command of the military units in the Confederate Arizona Territory. Once the command was concentrated at Fort Bliss, Sibley then sent them to Fort Thorn in New Mexico, where it remained for a month.

The army began operations in the territory in mid-February 1862, when it moved north against the Union garrison at Fort Craig. Arriving at the fort on February 13, Sibley first attempted to lure the Federals out into the open; when this plan failed, he then tried moving north of the fort to cut its supply lines. The Union commander, Colonel E.R.S. Canby, reacted by following Sibly north and attacking him at Valverde Ford. At this time, Sibley was either suffering from kidney disease or was drunk; early in the battle he was forced to turn command over to Colonel Thomas Green of the 5th Texas. The battle developed into a stalemate, which continued until late afternoon when the Union left counterattacked following a Confederate attack. This created a gap between the Union left and center; Green ordered a charge into the gap, driving the Union force back across the Rio Grande and capturing four cannons. Although he lost the Battle of Valverde, Canby refused to surrender as Sibley had expected, and Sibley felt that the fort was too strong to attack. Consequently, he decided to continue northward, crossing the border into New Mexico Territory and leaving Canby in his rear. Due to the number of horses lost at the battle, the 4th Texas had to be dismounted and a number of supply wagons were abandoned and burned.

Forage, there was none; commissary supplies were getting scarce; the cold season was coming; clothing was being needed; all of which the country afforded none." Theophilus Noel.

— Rosenberg, p. 53.

Sibley continued northward, capturing Albuquerque on March 2 and Santa Fe on March 13 but failed to capture the Union supplies there. This forced the Confederates to live off the land, but were only able to find a fraction of the supplies they needed; in addition, the foraging alienated the local population. After establishing his headquarters at Albuquerque, Sibley sent an advance force under the command Major Charles Pyron to Apache Canyon to watch for Union movements from the north along the Santa Fe Trail. A second detachment moved to the south to keep watch on Canby's force, while the main body under Lieutenant Colonel William R. Scurry moved slowly northward to unite with Pyron. A Union column from Fort Union under the command of Col. John P. Slough was moving south at this time. An advance guard from this column collided with Pyron's force on March 26, with the Confederates being driven back through the pass. That evening, in response to a message from Pyron, Scurry arrived with the main force and spent the next day observing the Union force, expecting an attack. At the Battle of Glorieta Pass, also known as "Gettysburg of the West", on March 28, the main Confederate force under Scurry fought a Union force marching from Fort Union, driving it back through the pass. However, a Union detachment was able to march around the Confederates and burned its wagon train, destroying most of the Confederate army's supplies.

After learning of the Union victory, Canby advanced northward in order to unite with the northern force and surround Sibley. Nearly out of ammunition and food, Sibley retreated back to Albuquerque with less than 2,000 men on April 8, a few hours after Canby arrived. Following the arrival of the force from Fort Union, Sibley decided to continue the retreat due to a shortage of rations, ammunition, and forage. The only battle to take place during the retreat was a small battle at Peralta on April 15, when Canby attempted to capture a portion of the Confederate army. After the Confederates took up positions in the adobe houses and ditches surrounding the town, Canby decided that the positions were too strong for an assault, so he tried to cut off the Confederates' retreat. During this movement, Sibley arrived with the 5th and 7th Texas regiments and managed to stop Canby's attack. Both sides bombarded each other with artillery until a sandstorm blew in, during which the Confederates withdrew from the field. The Confederates were forced to abandon eight howitzers and leave dozens of wounded behind during their retreat. A small rear was left to guard at Fort Thorn in New Mexico, but this also had to retreat in early July, due to advancing Union forces from California. During the campaign, the army lost approximately a thousand men, nearly half of which were missing or captured.

The army was sent eastward to Louisiana, where it fought in several skirmishes and battles, including the Red River Campaign. Sibley was relieved of command of the brigade due to drunkenness and reassigned to directing supply trains. The cannons captured at Valverde were formed into an artillery unit manned by volunteers from the 5th Texas, designated the Valverde Battery.

== Composition ==
The army was commanded by Brigadier General Henry Hopkins Sibley and its strength was about 2,500. Three regiments of mounted rifles originally formed the army, and other units already in the territory were added as the campaign progressed.

=== 4th Texas Mounted Rifles ===
- Colonel James Riley, Lieutenant Colonel William R. Scurry, Major Henry Raguet (wounded at Valverde)
  - Company A: Captain William Polk Hardeman
  - Company B: Captain Andrew Scarborough
  - Company C: Captain George Hampton
  - Company D: Captain Charles Leseur
  - Company E: Captain Charles Buckholts
  - Company F: Captain James Crosson
  - Company G: Captain Marinus van den Heuvel (killed at Valverde)
  - Company H: Captain William Alexander
  - Company I: Captain David Nunn
  - Company K: Captain William Foard

=== 5th Texas Mounted Rifles ===
- Colonel Thomas Green, Lieutenant Colonel Henry McNeill, Major Samuel Lockridge (killed at Valverde), Major John Shropshire (killed at Glorieta Pass)
  - Company A: Captain John Shropshire (promoted to major following Valverde)
  - Company B: Captain Willis Lang
  - Company C: Captain Denman Shannon
  - Company D: Captain Dan Ragsdale
  - Company E: Captain Hugh McPhaill
  - Company F: Captain George W. Campbell
  - Company G: Captain Jerome McGown
  - Company H: Captain Reddin Pridgen
  - Company I: Captain Ira Killough
  - Company K: Captain Charles Jordan

=== 7th Texas Mounted Rifles ===
- Colonel William Steele
  - Company C: Captain Hiram Mack Burrows
  - Company D: Captain William H. Cleaver
  - Company E: Captain Dr. William L. Kirksey
  - Company G: Captain Horatio White Fisher
  - Company K: Captain Thomas Orville Moody
- Advance battalion - Lieutenant Colonel John Sutton (killed at Valverde), Major Powhatan Jordan
  - Company A: Captain Powhatan Jordan (promoted to major), 1st Lt. Alfred Sturgis Thurmond
  - Company B: Captain Gustav Hoffmann
  - Company F: Captain James Wiggins
  - Company H: Captain Isaac Adair
  - Company I: Captain James Gardner (wounded at Valverde), 1st Lt. William B. Key

=== Battalion, 2nd Texas Mounted Rifles ===
- Major Charles L. Pyron
  - Company B: Lieutenant William Jett
  - Company D: Captain James Walker
  - Company E: Captain Ike Stafford

=== Provisional artillery battalion ===
- Major Trevanion Teel
  - Battery, 2nd Texas Mounted Rifles - Lieutenants Joseph H. McGinnis and Jordon H. Bennett
  - Battery, 4th Texas Mounted Rifles - Lieutenant John Relly
  - Battery, 5th Texas Mounted Rifles - Lieutenant William Wood

=== Arizona units ===
- Company A, Baylor's Arizona Regiment - Captain Sherod Hunter
- Arizona Rangers - Captain George Frazier
- Brigands - Captain John Phillips
- San Elizario Spy Company - Lieutenant Lemuel Nicholson, later Captain Bethel Coopwood, sick with smallpox at the start of the campaign.
- 1st Arizona Mounted Rifles Battalion - Lieutenant Colonel Philemon T. Herbert

== See also ==
- New Mexico Campaign
- New Mexico in the American Civil War

== Sources ==
- Bell, Kelly. "Duels in the Desert: Civil War in the Far West." Strategy & Tactics, Number 252 (September/October 2008).
- Frazier, Donald S. Blood & Treasure: Confederate Empire in the Southwest. College Station, TX: Texas A&M University Press, 1995. ISBN 0-89096-639-7
- Josephy, Alvin M. The Civil War in the American West. New York: Alfred A. Knopf, 1991. ISBN 0-394-56482-0
- Roseberg, David H. "Confederate Manifest Destiny in New Mexico." America's Civil War, July 2000 (Volume 13, Number 3).
- Taylor, John. Bloody Valverde: A Civil War Battle on the Rio Grande, February 21, 1862. Albuquerque, New Mexico: University of New Mexico Press, 1995. ISBN 0-8263-1632-8
- 7th Texas Muster Roll
