= Department of New Mexico =

19th-century department of the United States Army

The Department of New Mexico was a department of the United States Army during the mid-19th century. It was created as the 9th Department, a geographical department, in 1848 following the successful conclusion of the Mexican–American War, and renamed Department of New Mexico in 1853. It had to contend with an invading Confederate force during the New Mexico Campaign of the American Civil War from mid-1861 to early 1862, then with Apache tribes during the remainder of the conflict. It was merged into the Department of California after the end of the war as the District of New Mexico.

== History ==
=== Formation ===
The Department of New Mexico was created from the existing 9th Department on October 31, 1853, administering the defense of the geographical areas now Arizona and New Mexico. When the Civil War started in April 1861, the commander of the department, Colonel William W. Loring, resigned on June 11 to join the Confederate army and was succeeded by Colonel Edward R.S. Canby of the 10th U.S. Infantry. Canby was ordered to send all of his regular infantry to Kansas and raise two New Mexico regiments as replacements; however, Canby was reluctant to do so, both because he feared a Confederate invasion from Texas and also he didn't trust the local population, which he suspected of disloyalty.

=== Confederate invasion ===
The first Confederates to invade the department did so in July 1861. Lieutenant Colonel John Baylor, commander of a battalion of the 2nd Texas Mounted Rifles, moved into the territory on July 23 and by the next evening had arrived outside of Fort Filmore, near the settlement of Mesilla. He planned to take the fort by surprise attack, but two Confederate deserters alerted the Union garrison to his plans; instead, the next morning Baylor moved into Mesilla. In the afternoon, the Union commander, Major Isaac Lynde attempted to drive out the Confederates but failed; feeling that his position was hopeless, Lynde then tried to retreat northward to Fort Stanton. However, the Union column quickly lost its cohesiveness during the hot daylight hours, so that when it reached San Augustine Springs Lynde reported that not "more than 100 men of the infantry battalion" could offer effective resistance. When Baylor arrived at the springs near midday, Lynde surrendered his command without further fighting. Lynde would be cashiered from the army in November for this surrender, which was seen throughout the North as needless and cowardly. Due to Lynde's surrender, several forts in southeastern New Mexico were abandoned, which gave the local Apaches an opportunity to raid local settlements. Baylor issued a proclamation declaring the part of New Mexico south of the 34th parallel to be the Confederate Territory of Arizona, with himself as governor.

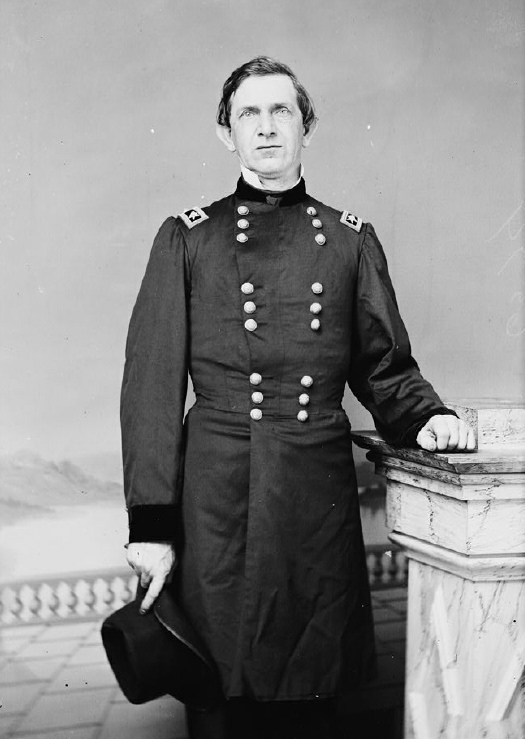
Colonel Edward R. S. Canby

No further Confederate reinforcements arrived that year, and Baylor's battalion was tied down fighting Apache bands in southern New Mexico. Canby spent the remainder of the year trying to raise five regiments of infantry, and wrote to the governor of Colorado, William Gilpin, asking him for Colorado volunteer troops to help defend New Mexico. Confederate general Henry H. Sibley raised a brigade of Texas cavalry over the summer of 1861 and brought it to New Mexico in late January and early February 1862. Intending to invade Colorado to seize the gold and silver mines located there, Sibley arrived outside Fort Craig on February 15. By this time, Canby had received only two companies of Colorado volunteers, and out of the five New Mexico regiments which were being recruited, only two had the full ten companies formed. After several days of skirmishing before the fort, during which Canby refused to leave his fortifications, Sibley moved to the eastern side of the Rio Grande and started north, intending to cut off Canby's lines of supply and of reinforcements to Albuquerque. However, Canby was able to intercept the Confederates at the Val Verde ford, resulting in a battle on February 21. While the Union force was defeated, they were able to withdraw back into Fort Craig and refused Sibley's demand of surrender. Rather than trying a direct assault on the fort, Sibley continued north towards Colorado; Canby dispatched his militia regiments ahead of Sibley to contest his advance, while remaining at the fort in order to intercept any reinforcements and supplies bound for Sibley.

Meanwhile, the 1st Colorado Infantry commanded by Colonel John P. Slough arrived at Fort Union, northeast of Santa Fe, on March 10. The regular Army commander of the fort was Colonel Gabriel Paul, who had orders from Canby to remain at the fort, but since Slough's commission to colonel predated that of Paul's by a few weeks, Slough took command of the fort and immediately planned an offensive against the Confederate forces, which at this time had reached Albuquerque. Advance detachments of both forces collided at Apache Canyon on March 26, with the Union detachment driving the Confederates back to the western end of the canyon before withdrawing to Pigeon's Ranch at the eastern end. After a day of both sides resting and receiving reinforcements, on March 28 the Confederates advanced down the canyon and attacked the united Union force commanded by Slough. Although the Confederates were able to push Slough back several miles, a smaller Union detachment was able to slip behind the Confederates and destroy their wagon train, which contained most of their supplies. With limited food and ammunition, Sibley had no choice but to retreat back to Texas.

Meanwhile, Canby decided that since his force was low on supplies and he had received no word on receiving reinforcements, decided to move north to unite with the garrison of Fort Union. He arrived at Albuquerque on April 8, just after the Confederates arrived; following a brief artillery duel, the Confederates abandoned the town during the night of April 17. Now having the Fort Union force in addition to his own, Canby followed the Confederates to the town of Peralta on February 17, where he fought a day- long skirmish which resulted in a few casualties but nothing else. Running extremely low on supplies and deciding that capturing any further Confederates would further strain his supplies, Canby went into encampment around Fort Craig and awaited supplies.

During this time, a command of regular army units and California volunteers were organized at Fort Yuma on the Colorado River in order to defeat the Confederate invasion. The command, designated the California Column, was placed under the command of Colonel James H. Carleton and started eastward through New Mexico in March. They skirmished with a Confederate company at Stanwix Station on March 30, which is considered to be the westernmost engagement of the Civil War. Continuing towards the Rio Grande, Carleton made contact with Canby's force on June 29; he then advanced over one hundred miles into Texas.

=== Remainder of the war ===
For the remainder of the Civil War, Union forces in the department would fight only Indian tribes. Canby was promoted and transferred to a command in the Eastern Theater, and Carleton, also promoted to brigadier general, was named as Canby's replacement. He reorganized the New Mexico volunteers into a regiment of cavalry command by Kit Carson. Over the next three years, Carleton launched multiple campaigns against the local tribes, especially the Apache and Navahos; the Navahos were forced onto a reservation by the spring of 1864, and the other tribes were forced to curtail their raiding.

=== Reorganized out of existence ===
On July 27, 1865 the Military Division of the Pacific was created under Major General Henry W. Halleck, replacing the Department of the Pacific, consisting of the Department of the Columbia that now consisted of the state of Oregon and the territories of Washington and Idaho and the expanded Department of California that now consisted of the States of California and Nevada under the District of Nevada, the Territory of New Mexico under the District of New Mexico and Territory of Arizona under the District of Arizona.

== Organization ==
=== Commanders ===
- Colonel Edwin Vose Sumner 1851–1853
- Colonel Benjamin Bonneville 1856–1857, 1858–1859
- Colonel Thomas T. Fauntleroy 1859 – January 22, 1861
- Colonel William W. Loring January 22 – June 16, 1861
- Colonel Edward R. S. Canby June 16, 1861 – June 22, 1862
- Brigadier General James H. Carleton September 18, 1862 – June 27, 1865

=== Districts ===
There were a total of ten districts in the department at various times; most were merged after the Confederate invasion. A list of districts include the following:

- District of Santa Fe, (1861–62)
- Southern District of New Mexico, (1861–62)
- Eastern District of New Mexico, (1862)
- Central District of New Mexico, (1862)
- District of Western Arizona, (1862–64)
- District of Arizona, (1862–70)
- District of Fort Craig, (1863–64)

=== Posts ===
The following is a list of posts occupied by the U. S. Army and Union Army in the department at various times during the existence of the Department of New Mexico.

- Post of Albuquerque (1846–1867)
- Fort Marcy (1846–1867)
- Post of Taos (1847–1852, 1860–1861)
- Camp Tecolate (1850–1860)
- Fort Defiance, Arizona (1851–1861)
  - Fort Canby, (1863–64)
- Fort Fillmore (1851–1862)
- Fort Webster (1851–1852, 1852–1853)
- Fort Union (1851–1894)
- Fort Burgwin (1852–1860)
- Camp Los Lunas (1852, 1859–1860, 1862)
- Fort Thorn (1853–1863)
- Fort Craig (1854–1885)
- Fort Stanton (1855–1896)
- Gila Depot (1857, 1863)
- Fort Riley, Kansas, (1859)
- Camp Loring (1858–1861)
- Camp at (Alexander) Hatch's Ranch (1859–1864)
- Post at Beck's Ranch (1859–1860)
- Camp Ojo Caliente (1859–1861)
- Fort Butler (1860)
- Camp Cogswell (1860)
- Fort Fauntleroy (1860–1861), Fort Lyon (1861–1862)
- Fort McLane (1860–1864)
- Post at Abó Pass (1861)
- Camp at Alamosa (1861)
- Mesilla Post (1861–1864) Headquarters of the District of Arizona until 1864.
- Camp Robledo (1861–1863)
- Fort Webster (1861)
- Camp Connelly (1862)
- Post at Cubero (1862)
- Las Cruces Post (1862)
- Camp Johnson (1862)
- Camp Lewis (1862)
- Camp at Pigeon's Ranch (1862)
- Paraje Post (1862)
- Los Pinos Depot/Station, Camp at Peralta, or Camp Peralta (1862–1866)
- Post of Socorro (1862–1863)
- Fort Sumner (1862–1869)
- Fort Wingate, or Fort El Gallo. (1862–1868)
- Camp Anton Chico (1863–1864)
- Fort Bascom (1863–1870)
- Camp in Cañon Largo (1863)
- Fort Cummings (1863–1873)
- Post at Franklin, Texas, (1863–64)
- Camp Canby (1863–1864), near Ganado, Arizona
- Camp Magoffin (1854, 1863–1865), near Alto
- Fort McRae (1863–1876), near Elephant Butte
- Camp Mimbres (1863–1864), near Dwyer
- Camp Pinos Altos (1863–1864)
- Camp San Pedro (1863–1864)
- Fort West (1863–1864)
- Camp La Hoya (1864)
- Camp Valverde (1864)
- Fort Selden (1865–1877)

== See also ==
- New Mexico Territory in the American Civil War
- California in the American Civil War

== Sources ==
- Colton, Ray C. The Civil War in the Western Territories: Arizona, Colorado, New Mexico, and Utah. Norman, Oklahoma: University of Oklahoma Press, 1959.
- Eicher, David J. Civil War High Commands. Stanford University Press, 2001.
- Frazier, Donald S. Blood & Treasure: Confederate Empire in the Southwest. College Station, Texas: Texas A&M University Press, 1995. ISBN 0-89096-639-7.
- Welcher, Frank J. The Union Army 1861-1865 Organization and Operations Volume II: The Western Theater. Indianapolis: Indiana University Press, 1993. ISBN 0-253-36454-X.
- Whitlock, Flint. Distant Bugles, Distant Drums: The Union Response to the Confederate Invasion of New Mexico. Boulder, Colorado: University Press of Colorado, 2006. ISBN 978-0-87081-835-6.
- David Stephen Heidler, Encyclopedia of the American Civil War
- United States War Dept, Oliver Diefendorf, Thomas M. O'Brien, General orders of the War department, embracing the years 1861, 1862 & 1863, Derby & Miller, 1864
