= 2nd New Mexico Infantry Regiment =

Infantry unit

The 2nd New Mexico Infantry Regiment, officially designated the 2nd Regiment New Mexico Volunteer Infantry or 2nd New Mexico Regiment Infantry, was a volunteer regiment in the Union Army, raised at Santa Fe, in the Territory of New Mexico, during July and August 1861. Its commander was Colonel Miguel E. Pino.

== History ==
The 2nd New Mexico Infantry Regiment was the second of five regiments raised for the defense of New Mexico under the authority of Department of New Mexico commander Edward Canby. Canby had succeeded to department command after his predecessor had resigned from the army and gone east to join the Confederacy, and immediately ordered the recruitment of companies that became the 1st and 2nd New Mexico Infantry. The men of the regiment were mainly Nuevomexicanos and enlisted for three years of service. Miguel Estanislado Pino, a wealthy farmer and politician from the Santa Fe area, was commissioned colonel of the regiment. The regiment was intended to concentrate at Albuquerque and by early fall eight companies had been organized and mustered into service. The regiment, which had several incomplete companies, was still short 400 men.

The regiment was attached to the Department of New Mexico, serving on duty at Fort Craig, N. M., until February, 1862, when it was in action at the Battle of Valverde on February 21, 1862. Lt. Col. Manuel Antonio Chaves led a detachment of 2nd New Mexican Volunteers whose scouts had detected the Confederate supply train at Johnson's Ranch nearby during the Battle of Glorieta Pass. Alerted by Chavez, Major John M. Chivington's command including Chavez, fell upon the train, defeated its guards and destroyed it, forcing the withdrawal of the Confederate Army from the battle to Santa Fe, where they began a long and dangerous march back into Texas.

Following the defeat of the Confederates at Glorieta Pass, 2nd Regiment was part of the pursuit of the Confederate forces from April 13–22, wherein they fought in the Action at Peralta on April 15, and at the action at Socorro on April 25.

Following that campaign the regiment had duty in the Central, Northern and Santa Fe Districts of the Department until May, when it was consolidated with the 1st New Mexico Infantry to form the 1st New Mexico Cavalry on May 31, 1862.

== See also ==
- List of New Mexico Territory Civil War units
