= Battle of Glorieta Pass =

1862 battle of the American Civil War

- Part of the Trans-Mississippi Theater of the American Civil War
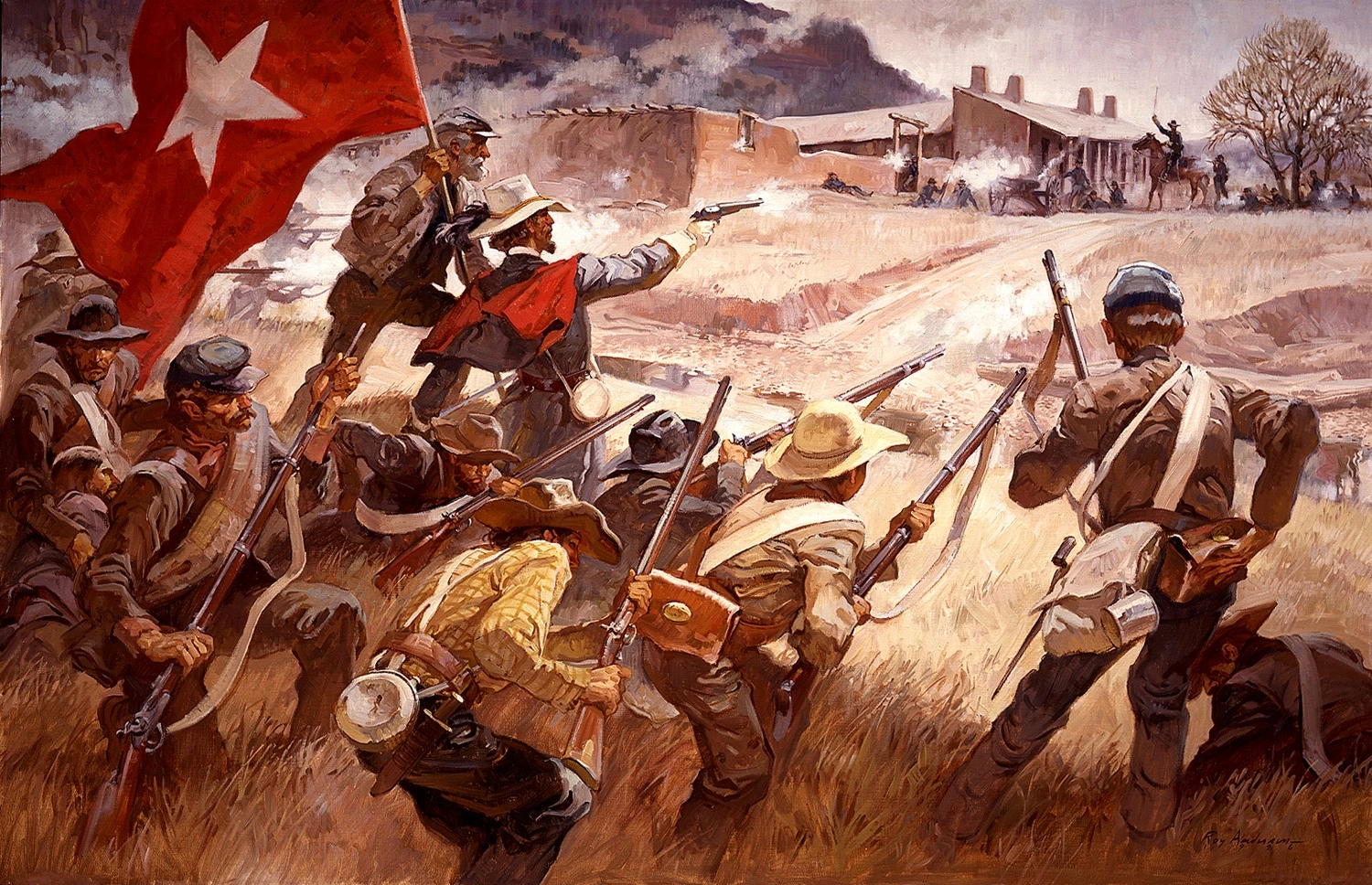
- 1986 painting of the battle
Date	March 26, 1862
Location	Santa Fe County, New Mexico Territory, U.S. 35°34′18″N 105°45′18″W
Result	Union victory (See aftermath)

Belligerents
United States	Confederate States

Commanders and leaders
John P. Slough; John M. Chivington	Charles L. Pyron; William R. Scurry; Henry H. Sibley

Units involved
2nd New Mexico Volunteer Infantry; 1st Colorado Infantry; 2nd Colorado Infantry; 1st Cavalry Regiment; 2nd Cavalry Regiment; 3rd Cavalry Regiment	2nd Texas Mounted Rifles; 4th Texas Mounted Rifles; 5th Texas Mounted Rifles; 7th Texas Mounted Rifles

Strength
1,300	1,100

Casualties and losses
Apache Canyon; 5 killed 14 wounded 3 missing Glorieta Pass; 46 killed 64 wounded 15 captured Total: 51 killed 78 wounded 15 captured 3 missing 147 total	Apache Canyon; 4 killed 20 wounded 75 captured Glorieta Pass; 46 killed 60 wounded 17 captured Total: 50 killed 80 wounded 92 captured 222 total

The Battle of Glorieta Pass was fought March 26–28, 1862, in the northern New Mexico Territory, by Union and Confederate forces during the American Civil War. While not the largest battle of the New Mexico campaign, the Battle of Glorieta Pass ended the Confederacy's efforts to capture the territory and other parts of the western United States.

The battle took place at the eponymous mountain pass in the Sangre de Cristo Mountains, in what is now Santa Fe County, New Mexico. Confederate forces sought to break the Union's possession of the West along the base of the Rocky Mountains, with the ultimate aim of controlling strategically valuable mines, railroads, and cities throughout the region. The invasion was the westernmost military operation of the war, and the South's only real attempt to conquer and occupy Union territory.

A skirmish occurred on March 26 between advance elements from each army, with the main battle occurring on March 28. Although the Confederates were able to push Union forces back through the pass, they had to retreat when their supply train was destroyed and most of their horses and mules were killed or driven off. Eventually, the invading force was forced to withdraw entirely from the territory, with the Union retaking full control by June.

As the Confederacy never attempted another invasion of the region, Glorieta Pass represented the climax of the ambitious New Mexico campaign, remaining an important event in New Mexico's Civil War history.

== New Mexico campaign ==
The southern portion of the New Mexico Territory had been largely neglected by both the federal government and the territorial government in Santa Fe. As a result, Confederate sympathy was strong, in hopes of receiving better treatment by the new government. Following secession moves by residents, Confederate forces seized Mesilla and captured the federal troops there, who made a halfhearted attempt to retreat to Santa Fe. In early 1862, the Confederacy established the Confederate Arizona Territory, which included the southern halves of both modern Arizona and New Mexico. The territorial capital was at Mesilla, some 45 miles (72 km) from El Paso and near today's major city of Las Cruces. The strategic goals were to gain access to the gold and silver mines of California and the Colorado Territory and the seaports in Southern California, and thus evade the Union naval blockade.

The commanders of the New Mexico Campaign were Confederate Brig. Gen. Henry Hopkins Sibley and Union Col. Edward Canby. Sibley attempted to capture Fort Craig, completely outmaneuvering Canby at the Battle of Valverde in February and driving him back into his fort, but failed to force Canby's surrender. Sibley then bypassed the fort and advanced north through the Rio Grande Valley, occupying Santa Fe on March 10. Canby remained at Fort Craig, hoping to cut Sibley's logistical support from Texas and awaiting reinforcements before he dared to take the offensive. Sibley made his headquarters at the abandoned Union storehouse at Albuquerque.

In March, Sibley sent a Confederate force of 200–300 Texans under the command of Maj. Charles L. Pyron on an advance expedition over the Glorieta Pass, a strategic location on the Santa Fe Trail at the southern tip of the Sangre de Cristo Mountains southeast of Santa Fe. Control of the pass would allow the Confederates to advance onto the High Plains and make an assault on Fort Union, a Union stronghold on the route northward over Raton Pass. Sibley sent six companies under the command of Col. Tom Green to block the eastern end of Glorieta Pass, turning any Union defensive position in the Sangre de Cristos.

== Opposing forces ==
=== Union ===
Union forces were led by Col. John P. Slough of the 1st Colorado Infantry, with units under the command of Maj. John M. Chivington. Canby had called up local militia and volunteer forces, as well as volunteers from Colorado. In the action on March 26, Chivington had three infantry companies and one mounted company of the 1st Colorado and a detachment of the 1st and 3rd U.S. Cavalry regiments. During the main battle on the 28th, Slough commanded, in person, nine companies of the 1st Colorado, a detachment from the 1st, 2nd and 3rd U.S. Cavalry regiments, and two artillery batteries. Chivington commanded five companies of the 5th U.S. Infantry, one company from the 1st Colorado, James Hobart Ford's independent company from the 2nd Colorado, and some New Mexico militiamen.

=== Confederate ===
The Confederates were led by Charles L. Pyron and William Read Scurry. From late summer to early autumn of 1861, the Confederacy raised a brigade of three volunteer mounted regiments—the 4th, 5th and 7th Texas Mounted Volunteers—along with supporting artillery and supply units. Virtually every field officer was a veteran of the Indian Wars or the Mexican-American War. During the battle on March 26, Pyron had his battalion of the 2nd Texas Mounted Rifles, four companies of the 5th Texas Mounted Rifles under Maj. John Shropshire and two cannons; Scurry's force included nine companies of the 4th Texas Mounted Rifles under Maj. Henry Raguet, five companies of the 7th Texas Mounted Rifles under Maj. Powhatan Jordan and three additional cannons.

== Battle ==
Prior to the battle, Union forces performed a forced march from Denver, over Raton Pass, to Fort Union and then to Glorieta Pass, covering the distance of 400 miles (600 km) in 14 days. Combat commenced shortly after their arrival at the battlefield, leaving them little time to recuperate.

=== Apache Canyon ===
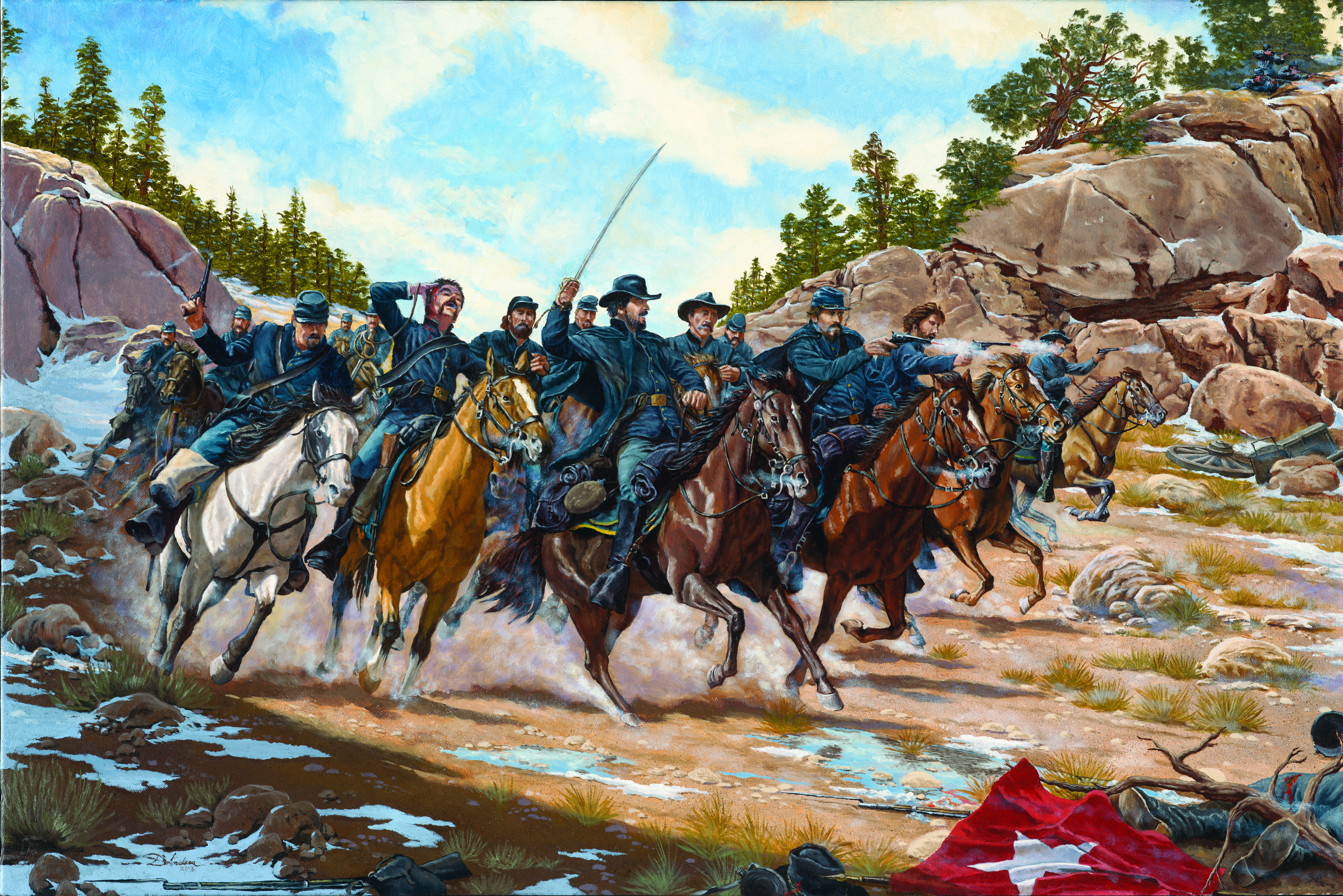
Action at Apache Canyon by Domenick D'Andrea

Pyron's force of 300 camped at Apache Canyon, at one end of Glorieta Pass, leaving a picket post of 50 men at the summit of the pass. Chivington led 418 soldiers to the pass, and on the morning of March 26, moved out to attack. After noon, Chivington's men captured the picket post and found the main force behind them. Chivington advanced on them, but their artillery fire threw him back. He regrouped, split his force to the two sides of the pass, caught the Confederates in a crossfire, and soon forced them to retire. Pyron retired about 1.5 miles (2.4 km) to a narrow section of the pass and formed a defensive line before Chivington's men appeared. The Union forces flanked Pyron's men again and punished them with enfilade fire. Pyron ordered another retreat, but the withdrawal of the artillery caused the Confederates to become disorganized and start fighting in separate clusters of men. Chivington ordered a mounted Colorado company to make a frontal charge against the artillery; this succeeded in capturing several Confederates and scattering the rest. Not knowing if Confederate reinforcements were nearby, Chivington then retired and went into camp at Kozlowski's Ranch to await Slough with the main body. His small victory was a morale boost for Slough's army.

No fighting occurred the next day, as reinforcements arrived for both sides. Scurry's troops arrived at 3:00 am on March 27, swelling the Confederate force to about 1,100 men and five cannons; as senior officer present, he took command of the entire Confederate force. Thinking that Slough would attack again and expecting Green to arrive in the Union rear at any time, Scurry chose to remain in place for the day, digging rifle pits. Slough arrived early in the morning of March 28 with about 900 more men, bringing the Union strength to 1,300.

=== Glorieta Pass ===
Battle of Glorieta Pass: actions on March 28 Confederate Union

Both Scurry and Slough decided to attack on March 28 and set out early to do so. Expecting the Confederates to remain in Apache Canyon, Slough sent Chivington with two infantry battalions, under Lewis and Wynkoop, out in a circling movement with orders to go hide out at Glorieta Pass and hit the Texans in the flank once Slough's main force had engaged their front. Chivington did as ordered, and his men waited above the pass for Slough and the enemy to arrive. Instead of remaining at Apache Canyon as Slough had expected, though, Scurry advanced down the canyon more rapidly than Slough had anticipated. Scurry believed the Union force was retreating to Fort Union. He intended to attack them until Green could arrive. One cannon and a small guard were left at Johnson's Ranch, while the rest of the Confederate force—more than 1000 men—marched eastwards along the Santa Fe Trail.

When Slough found the Texans so far forward, he launched an attack, hitting them about 11:00 am, some 1/2 mile (800 m) from Pigeon's Ranch. A provisional battalion of four companies from the 1st Colorado, supported by both batteries, was commanded by Lt. Col. Samuel F. Tappan, who deployed his men across the trail. The Confederates dismounted and formed a line across the canyon, but the terrain caused some companies to become intermingled. Tappan was initially successful and held his ground for a half-hour, but the Confederates' numerical superiority enabled them to outflank Tappan's line by noon. The Union troops were thrown back in confusion, but managed to take up position around the adobe ranch buildings. Slough reformed his men several hundred yards closer to Pigeon's Ranch, with the four companies under Tappan and an artillery battery on a hill to the left, the other battery supported by two companies in the center across the road, and the remaining two companies on the ridge to the right.

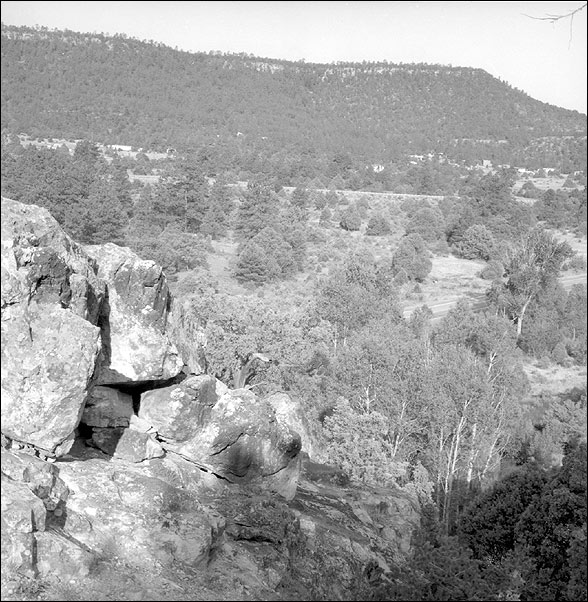
Glorieta Pass battlefield: This photograph was taken in 1990 from Sharpshooter's Ridge, just north of Pigeon's Ranch. It was the location of the Union right flank during the last day's battle.

Scurry then launched a three-pronged attack. Pyron and Raguet were ordered to attack the Union right and Shropshire the Union left, with the remainder led by Scurry against the Union center, and the artillery firing in support. The attack on the Union left was beaten back, with Shropshire killed. The attack on the center stalled, while the artillery was forced to withdraw after one cannon was disabled and a limber destroyed. The attack itself then stalled, with the Confederates fighting by squads "with a desperation unequaled by any engagement of the war." At around 3:00 pm, the Confederates outflanked the Union right, but Raguet was mortally wounded. From the ridge (thereafter known as "Sharpshooters Ridge"), Confederate riflemen started picking off the artillerymen and infantry below them. Scurry again pressed the Union center, and the Union position became untenable. Slough reluctantly ordered a retreat, and Tappan formed the companies on the left into a rear guard. Slough reformed his line a half-mile east of Pigeon's Ranch, where skirmishing continued until dusk. The Union men finally retreated to Kozlowski's Ranch, leaving the Confederates in possession of the battlefield.

==== Johnson's Ranch ====
With the sounds of battle echoing in the distance, Lt. Col. Manuel Chaves of the 2nd New Mexico Infantry, commander of the New Mexican volunteers, informed Maj. Chivington that his scouts had located the Confederate supply train at Johnson's Ranch. After watching the supply train for an hour, Chivington's force descended the slope and attacked, driving off or capturing the small guard with few casualties on either side. They then looted and burned 80 supply wagons and spiked the cannon, either killing or driving off about 500 horses and mules before returning with their prisoners to Kozlowski's Ranch. With no supplies to sustain his advance, Scurry had to retreat to Santa Fe, the first step on the long road back to San Antonio, Texas. Thanks to Chaves' assistance, the Union had turned a defeat into victory and stopped further Confederate advances in the Southwest. Glorieta Pass was the turning point of the war in the New Mexico Territory.

Parts of the Glorieta Pass Battlefield are preserved in Pecos National Historical Park and are the site of an annual NPS Civil War Encampment event commemorating the battle.

== Controversy ==
Many New Mexicans disputed the view that Chivington was the hero of Johnson's Ranch. Many Santa Fe residents credited James L. Collins, a Bureau of Indian Affairs official, who had suggested the roundabout attack on the supply train. He was also accused of almost letting the opportunity slip by him. On January 23, 1864, the New Mexico Territorial Legislature adopted a resolution that did not mention Chivington and instead asked President Lincoln to promote William H. Lewis and Asa B. Carey, both regular army officers, for "distinguished service" in the battle. On March 8, the Rio Abajo Press of Albuquerque complained about "Col. Chivington's strutting about in plumage stolen from Captain William H. Lewis" (it did not mention Carey). According to the newspaper editor, "Someone of the party" suggested the attack, which Chivington only agreed to after "two hours persuasion." Furthermore, Lewis had led the attack, while Chivington was "viewing the scene from afar".

A more serious charge made against Chivington was that if he had hurried to reinforce Slough as soon as he heard gunfire coming from Pigeon's Ranch, his 400 men might have been enough to win the battle for the Federals, especially if he had attacked Scurry's flank as he had been ordered.

== Aftermath ==
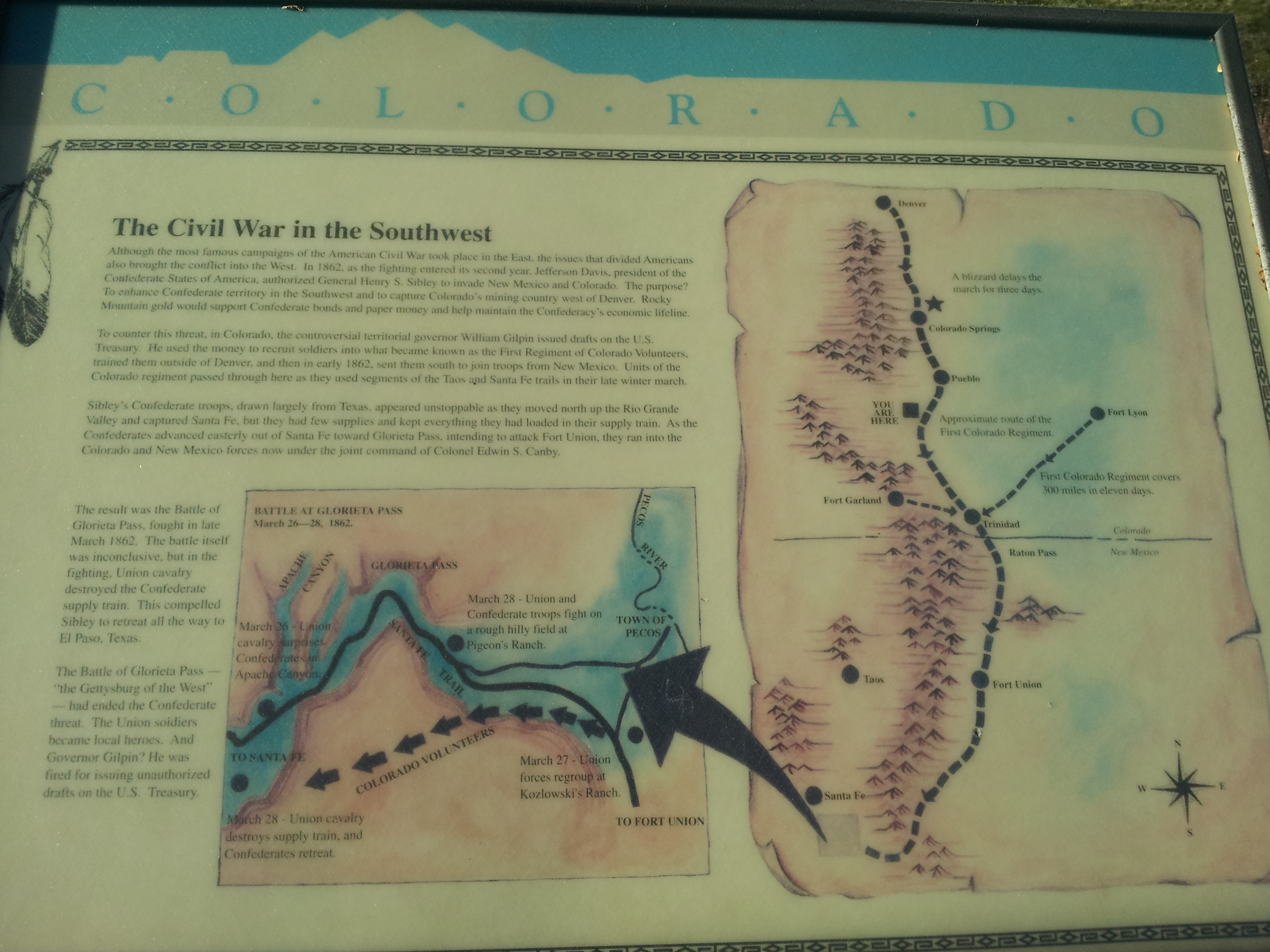
Battle of Glorieta Pass marker at the Cuerno Verde Rest Area, Colorado

In the end, the Battle of Glorieta Pass was consequential, though historians have remarked that its nickname "the Gettysburg of the West" vastly inflates its importance and "serves the novelist better than the historian." Despite the fact that the Confederates took the field, they were forced to retreat to Santa Fe due to the destruction of their supplies and eventually abandon New Mexico Territory. Further, the battle at Glorieta foiled Sibley's plan to obtain his key objective: the capture of the federal base at Fort Union. That may have compelled Union forces to retire north of Raton Pass and back into Colorado Territory.

In any case, the dream of a Confederate stronghold in the Southwest was impractical; New Mexico could not provide enough sustenance for any prolonged Confederate occupation. Furthermore, the approach of the Federal "California Column" eastward through the New Mexico Territory during the summer of 1862 would have seriously jeopardized Confederate control of the region.

== Battlefield preservation ==
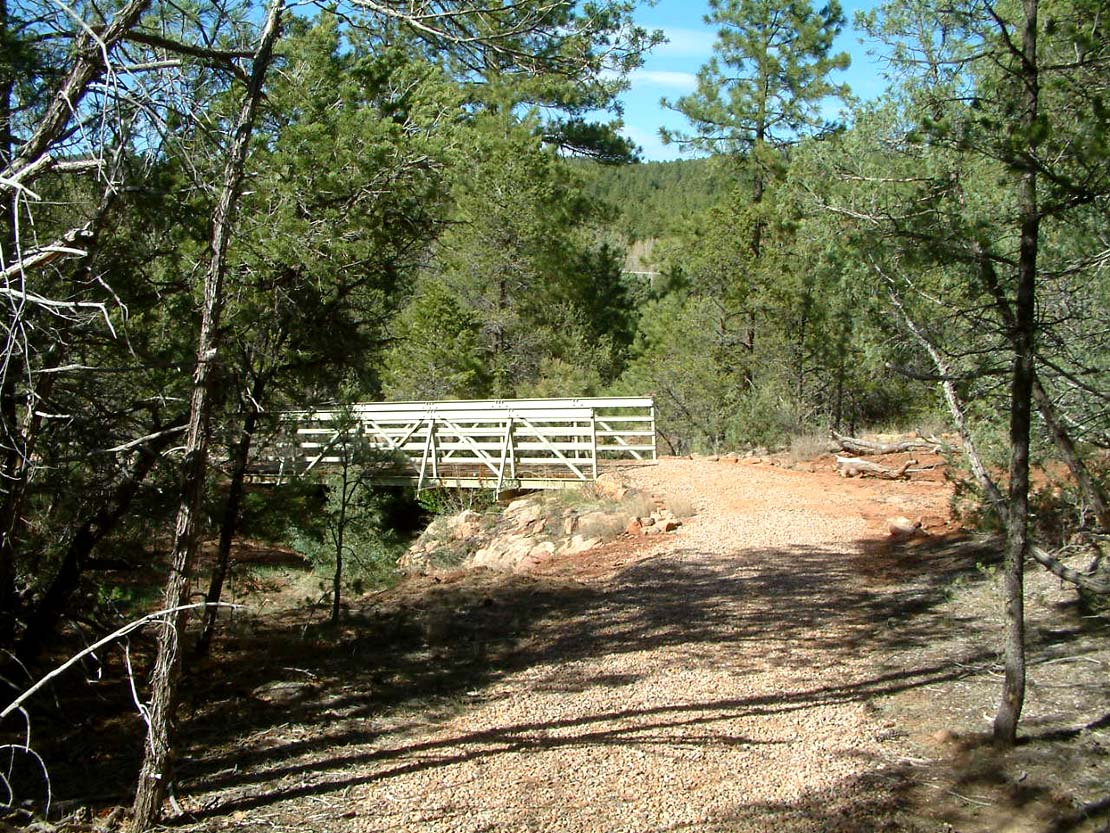
The battlefield in 2012

In 1987 two Confederate burial sites were discovered at Pigeon's Ranch. One was the solitary grave of Maj. John Samuel Shropshire, the other was a mass grave of 30 Confederates. Only Shropshire and five others could be positively identified. On August 5, 1990, Maj. Shropshire's remains were reburied next to his parents in his family's cemetery in Bourbon County, Kentucky. The remaining 30 Confederates were reinterred in the Santa Fe National Cemetery.

In 1993, the congressionally appointed Civil War Sites Advisory Commission issued its "Report on the Nation's Civil War Battlefields". The commission was tasked with identifying the nation's historically significant Civil War sites, determining their importance and providing recommendations for their preservation to Congress.

Of the roughly 10,500 actions of the U.S. Civil War, 384 (3.7%) were identified by the commission as principal battles and rated according to their significance and threat of loss. The Battle of Glorieta Pass received the highest rating from the commission, priority I (class A). Class A battlefields are principal strategic operations having a direct impact on the course of the war. With this rating, the commission placed Glorieta Pass on the same level as battles such as Gettysburg and Antietam. The priority I rating identified Glorieta Pass as being not only one of the most important, but also one of the most highly endangered battlefields in the country. Only 10 other battlefields received the priority I (class A) rating. The commission recommended that Congress focus its preservation efforts on priority I, nationally significant battlefields.

Since 1993 portions of the Glorieta Pass Battlefield have become a unit of the National Park Service. The Glorieta Pass unit (Pigeon's Ranch) comprises roughly 20% of the total battlefield. The remaining 80% is in private ownership. Glorieta Pass Battlefield is managed by Pecos National Historical Park and supported by the Glorieta Battlefield Coalition, a non-profit citizens' organization. The American Battlefield Trust and its partners have acquired and preserved 19 acres (7.7 ha) of the Glorieta Pass battlefield as of mid-2023.

The Glorieta Pass Battlefield is also designated as a National Historic Landmark.

== Depictions in popular culture ==
The 1966 Sergio Leone film The Good, the Bad and the Ugly refers obliquely to the battle, setting one scene during the post-battle retreat of Sibley's men.

The battle is described in the 1999 historical novel Glorieta Pass by P. G. Nagle.

The events at Johnson's Ranch are depicted in Elmer Kelton's 2009 novel, Many A River, with some changes to fit them to his plot.

The journey of Scurry's Confederate and Slough's Union forces to the battleground, as well as a detailed narrative of the fight, are described in Tom Bensing's 2012 biography Silas Soule, A Short, Eventful Life of Moral Courage.

The battle is given a full chapter in historian Megan Kate Nelson’s 2020 book The Three-Cornered War, which was a finalist for the 2021 Pulitzer Prize.
