= Alexander McRae =

Alex McRae or Alexander McRae or MacRae may refer to:

- Alexander McRae (explorer) (1844–1888), Australian explorer, pastoralist and entrepreneur
- Alexander McRae (1829–1862), U.S. Army officer killed in the Battle of Valverde
- Alexander MacRae (c. 1888–1938), Scottish-Australian entrepreneur
- Alexander Duncan McRae (1874–1946), Canadian businessman
