= Henry Sibley =

Henry Sibley may refer to:

- Henry Hastings Sibley (1811–1891), central figure in the founding of Minnesota, first governor, Union general
- Henry Hopkins Sibley (1816–1886), Confederate general
- Henry Evan Sibley (1867–1917), South Australian architect, designer of the pedestal Light's Vision statue in Adelaide (partner in the firm Garlick, Sibley & Wooldridge)
