= Charles L. Pyron =

Confederate army officer (1819–1869)

Charles Lynn Pyron
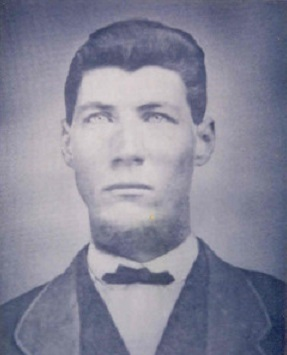
- Born: May 10, 1819; Marion County, Alabama
- Died: August 24, 1869 (aged 50); San Antonio, Texas
- Military career
- Allegiance: United States; Confederate States
- Branch: United States Army; Confederate States Army
- Service years: 1846 (USA); 1861–1865 (CSA)
- Rank: Colonel (CSA)
- Commands: 2nd Texas Mounted Rifles
- Conflicts: Mexican–American War; American Civil War

Charles Lynn Pyron (May 10, 1819 – August 24, 1869) was a soldier in the United States Army in the Mexican–American War and a Confederate Army officer in the American Civil War. He fought at the Battle of Monterrey in the Mexican–American War, and during the Civil War fought in the West, including at the battles of Valverde and Glorieta Pass.

== Early life ==
Pyron was born in 1819 in Marion County, Alabama, the son of Charles Pyron. He served with the United States Army during the Mexican–American War. After the war, he purchased a ranch along the San Antonio River in Texas, and also became married in 1849.

== Civil War ==
During the American Civil War, Pyron served in Confederate Brigadier General Henry Hopkins Sibley's New Mexico Campaign, an invasion of New Mexico and Colorado with the goal of capturing the Southwest United States, including the Colorado gold fields and California. He raised a company of cavalry for the Confederates at San Antonio, which served as Company B of John Baylor's Second Texas Mounted Rifles at Fort Lancaster and Fort Stockton.

Pyron was a major in the Confederate Army and in March 1862 commanded a Confederate force of 200–300 Texans on an advance expedition over the Glorieta Pass. The pass was a strategic location on the Santa Fe Trail at the southern tip of the Sangre de Cristo Mountains southeast of Santa Fe. Control of the pass would allow the Confederates to advance onto the High Plains and to make an assault on Fort Union, the Union stronghold along the invasion route northward over Raton Pass. After a few small battles, Union forces forced the withdrawal of the Confederates.

He was promoted to lieutenant colonel after the New Mexico campaign and was given command of Baylor's Second Texas Mounted Rifles, which was reorganized as the Second or Pyron's Texas Cavalry. He was later promoted to colonel.

== Later life ==
After the war, he lived on his ranch in San Antonio, Texas, and died on August 24, 1869.
