= Thomas Duncan (general) =

American Brigadier General

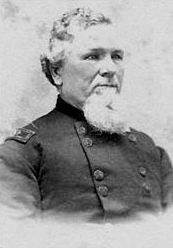
- Brigadier General Thomas Duncan during the American Civil War
- Born: April 14, 1819; Kaskaskia, Illinois
- Died: January 7, 1887 (aged 67); Washington, D.C.
- Burial place: Arlington National Cemetery
- Military career
- Allegiance: United States of America; Union
- Branch: United States Army; Union Army
- Service years: 1846–1873
- Rank: Lieutenant Colonel; Brevet Brigadier General
- Conflicts: Black Hawk War; Mexican–American War; American Civil War; American Indian Wars

Thomas Duncan (April 14, 1819 – January 7, 1887) was a career officer in the U.S. Army, serving as a lieutenant colonel during the American Civil War. In 1867, he was nominated and confirmed for appointment as a brevet brigadier general in the regular army, to rank from March 13, 1865, for his service in the Civil War.

== Biography ==
Duncan was born in Kaskaskia, Illinois. He began his military career at age 13, serving as a private in the Illinois Mounted Volunteers in 1832 during the Black Hawk War. On May 27, 1846, he was appointed from Illinois as a first lieutenant in the Regiment of Mounted Rifles. He served during the Mexican–American War, and was engaged in the siege and surrender of Veracruz. He was promoted to captain on March 12, 1848.

Duncan was promoted to major in the Regular Army and was transferred to the reorganized 3rd Cavalry Regiment (United States) on August 3, 1861. During the Civil War, he commanded Fort Craig in New Mexico, and was in charge of the 3rd Cavalry Regiment (United States) forces at the Battle of Valverde, New Mexico. He was wounded in a skirmish at Albuquerque on April 8, 1862, and was appointed brevet lieutenant colonel in the regular army for his actions in that engagement. He was assistant provost marshal for the Department of the Northwest, District of Iowa from April 25, 1863, through 1864. He was appointed brevet colonel to rank from March 13, 1865.

Following the war, he remained in the Regular Army. As a lieutenant colonel, he commanded a detachment of the 5th U.S. cavalry starting July 28, 1866. During this time, William "Buffalo Bill" Cody served as a scout for the regiment. Duncan later commanded the District of Nashville until September 1868.

On March 1, 1867, President Andrew Johnson nominated Duncan for appointment to the grade of brevet brigadier general in the regular army, to rank from March 13, 1865, and the United States Senate confirmed the appointment on March 2, 1867.

After his command of the District of Nashville, Duncan was ordered to the Department of the Platte, was stationed successively at Fort McPherson and Fort D. A. Russell, and was afterward in charge of the construction of Sidney Barracks. Lingering complications from his wound compelled him to be medically retired from active service on January 15, 1873.

Thomas Duncan died in Washington, D.C., on January 7, 1887, and was buried in Arlington National Cemetery.

== See also ==
- List of American Civil War brevet generals (Union)
