= New Mexico Territory in the American Civil War =

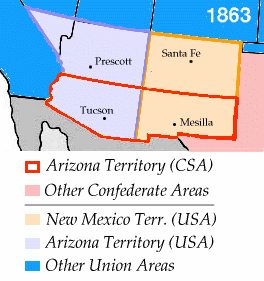

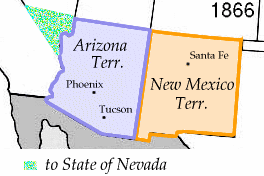

The New Mexico Territory, comprising what are today the U.S. states of New Mexico and Arizona, as well as the southern portion of Nevada, played a small but significant role in the trans-Mississippi theater of the American Civil War. Despite its remoteness from the major battlefields of the east, and its being part of the sparsely populated and largely undeveloped American frontier, both Confederate and Union governments claimed ownership over the territory, and several important battles and military operations took place in the region. Roughly 7,000-8,000 troops from the New Mexico Territory served the Union, more than any other western state or territory.

In 1861, the Confederacy claimed the southern half of the vast New Mexico Territory as its own Arizona Territory and waged the ambitious New Mexico Campaign in an attempt to control the American Southwest and open up access to Union-held California. Confederate power in the New Mexico Territory was effectively broken when the campaign culminated in the Union victory at the Battle of Glorieta Pass in 1862. Although the Confederacy never attempted another invasion of the region, its territorial government continued to operate out of Texas, with Confederate troops marching under the Arizona flag until the end of the war.

== Prelude to war ==
The New Mexico Territory was organized as a U.S. territory in 1850, and for many years its precise boundaries and internal administration remained undefined. In 1853, the territory was expanded south of the Gila River in the Gadsden Purchase. Proposals for a division of the territory and the organization of a separate Territory of Arizona were advanced as early as 1856. The first proposals for a separate Arizona Territory were not based on the modern east–west division but rather a north–south division. These proposals arose from concerns about the effectiveness of the territorial government in Santa Fe to administer the newly acquired southern portions of the territory.

The first proposal dates to a conference held in Tucson that convened on August 29, 1856. The conference issued a petition requesting organization of the territory and signed by 256 people to the U.S. Congress, and elected Nathan P. Cooke as the territorial delegate to Congress. In January 1857, a bill for the organization of the territory was introduced into the United States House of Representatives, but the proposal was defeated on the grounds that the population of the proposed territory was yet too small. Later, a similar proposal was defeated in the Senate. The proposal for creation of the territory was controversial in part because of the perception that the New Mexico Territory was under the influence of southern sympathizers who sought to expand slavery into the Southwest.

In February 1858, the New Mexico territorial legislature adopted a resolution in favor of the creation of the Arizona Territory, but with a north–south border along the 109th meridian, with the additional stipulation that all the Indians of New Mexico would be removed to northern Arizona. In April 1860, impatient for Congress to act, a convention of thirty-one delegates met in Tucson and adopted a constitution for a provisional territorial government of the area south of 34 degrees north. The delegates elected Dr. Lewis S. Owings as provisional governor.

However, due to the small number of inhabitants in the proposed territory, the U.S. Congress continued to refuse to recognize any proceedings from any of the conventions being held in the area. Making matters worse, on March 2, 1861, the U.S. government formally revoked a contract with the Butterfield Overland Stagecoach Company which was being used to support delivery of United States mail on the overland route which ran from San Antonio through El Paso, Texas, and on to Mesilla, Tucson and California. The loss of this key communications link with the rest of the United States angered settlers in the Arizona region, just as many states in the Deep South were seceding from the Union.

== Politics ==
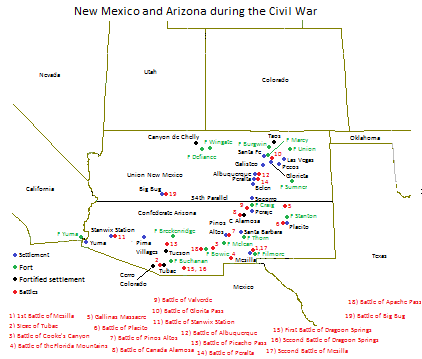

Having been only recently annexed from Mexico following the Mexican–American War, many New Mexicans were apathetic to the ongoing secession crisis in the United States. Aside from their distinct ethnicity and cultural identity, which was primarily Hispanic, the prior experiences of the territory's inhabitants had generated considerable alienation from and even animosity toward Texans. In early 1861, Texans overwhelmingly voted to secede from the Union and the state subsequently joined the Confederacy. As a result, when a side had to be chosen, much of the population of the New Mexico Territory sided with the Union. Many settlers in the region carved out by the Gadsden Purchase willingly joined the Confederate States of America, while much of the rest of the territory remained loyal to the Union. While the people of the southern portion of the territory had closer ties to the South, the more populous northern section had strong ties to Northern trade via the Santa Fe Trail, which connected the region with Kansas and Missouri.

Reflecting Southern sentiment in the southern portion of the territory, a convention was held at Mesilla on March 16, 1861, that adopted an ordinance of secession and called on the citizens of the western portion of the territory (now southern Arizona) to "join us in this movement". Subsequently, a second convention was held in Tucson on March 28, chaired by Mark Aldrich, who had been Tucson's first mayor. The Tucson convention ratified the Mesilla convention, and provisional officers were elected for the newly established Arizona Territory with Dr. Lewis S. Owings as its governor and Granville Henderson Oury as its first delegate to the Confederate States Congress, who immediately began petitioning for admission.

Early in the war, the Confederacy regarded the Arizona Territory as a valuable route by which to potentially access the Pacific Ocean, with the specific intention of capturing California. In July 1861, a small Confederate force of Texans, under the command of Lieutenant Colonel John R. Baylor, captured Mesilla, in the eastern part of the territory. When the town fort was abandoned by its Union garrison, Baylor's force cut off the fleeing Union troops and forced them to surrender. On August 1, Baylor issued a "Proclamation to the People of the Territory of Arizona", which declared that he was taking possession of the territory for the Confederacy, with Mesilla as the capital and himself as the governor.

The social and political condition of Arizona being little short of general anarchy, and the people being literally destitute of law, order, and protection, the said Territory, from the date hereof, is hereby declared temporarily organized as a military government until such time as Congress may otherwise provide. I, John R. Baylor, lieutenant-colonel, commanding the Confederate Army in the Territory of Arizona, hereby take possession of said Territory in the name and behalf of the Confederate States of America. For all purposes herein specified, and until otherwise decreed or provided, the Territory of Arizona shall comprise all that portion of New Mexico lying south of the thirty-fourth parallel of north latitude.

— Lt. Colonel John R. Baylor, CSA

Baylor's subsequent dismantling of the existing Union forts in the territory left the white settlers at the mercy of local Apache Indians, who quickly gained control of the area and forced many of the settlers to seek refuge in Tucson. Even so, the people of Arizona remained firm in their support of Baylor, and held another convention on August 28, 1861, in Tucson, ratifying Baylor's proclamation. Once again, G.H. Oury was re-elected as a congressman to the Confederate States Congress. Governor Baylor approved the proceedings, and Delegate Oury was sent off to Richmond, Virginia on October 1, 1861.

Delegate Oury was not initially seated in the Congress, but met with Confederate leaders as well as President Jefferson Davis. Texas Congressman John Reagan introduced a bill on November 22, 1861, to formally create the Territory of Arizona. After two months of debate, the legislation passed on January 13, 1862, and the territory was officially created by proclamation of President Davis on February 14, (Note: Exactly fifty years later, on the same date in 1912, Arizona became a U.S. state.) with this proclamation:

I, Jefferson Davis, President of the Confederate States of America, do issue this, my proclamation, declaring said "Act to organize the Territory of Arizona" to be in full force and operation, and that I have proceeded to appoint the officers therein provided to be appointed in and for said Territory.

— President Jefferson Davis

The following month, in March 1862, the U.S. House of Representatives, now devoid of the southern delegates and controlled by Republicans, passed a bill to create its own version of the Arizona Territory, using instead the north–south border of the 107th meridian. The use of a north–south border rather than an east–west one had the effect of denying a de facto ratification of the Confederate Arizona Territory. The house bill stipulated that Tucson was to be capital. It also stipulated that slavery was to be abolished in the new territory. The Arizona Organic Act passed the Senate in February 1863 without the Tucson-as-capital stipulation, and was signed into law by President Abraham Lincoln on February 24, which became the date of the official organization of the U.S. Arizona Territory. The first capital was at Fort Whipple, followed by Prescott, in the northern Union-controlled area.

At the start of the Civil War, the New Mexico territorial governor was Abraham Rencher; although a Democrat from North Carolina, he refused to support secession, and called out the territorial militia to counteract the Confederate invasion of July 1861. That month he was replaced by Henry Connelly, a native of New Mexico who would serve as governor for the remainder of the war. Under his leadership, the slavery laws of the territory were repealed and the Indian tribes of the territory were moved onto reservations.

== Military actions ==
=== New Mexico campaign ===
A significant Confederate offensive to seize the New Mexico Territory in more than just name resulted in the New Mexico Campaign, which was fought from February to April 1862. The Confederate Army of New Mexico, marching west from Texas, briefly occupied the southern New Mexico Territory, arriving in February 1862, and tried to push north to Colorado in an effort to capture its valuable mineral resources. Union troops re-captured the territory in early 1862, forcing the Confederates to retreat following the Battle of Glorieta Pass in March. Confederate troops withdrew because a detachment of the 1st Colorado Infantry under Major John M. Chivington burned their supply train. Despite the Union regulars, 1st Colorado Infantry, and New Mexican Volunteers being defeated on the battlefield, they ultimately won the campaign; the battle was one of several later dubbed the "Gettysburg of the West".

As the war dragged on and Union troops were withdrawn to fight elsewhere, famed explorer and frontiersman Kit Carson helped organize and command the 1st New Mexico Cavalry, a militia unit, to engage in campaigns against the Apache, Navajo, and Comanche in New Mexico and Texas, as well as participated in the earlier Battle of Valverde against the Confederates.

=== Other actions ===
Federal troops left Arizona early in 1861 to reinforce operations in the east, the territory had been left open to Apache attack. Most notably, Mangas Coloradas and Cochise led a series of raids on white civilians that left dozens dead and spread fear and terror across the territory. The Apache appeared to show equal hostility to both Union and Confederate forces, and both armies attempted to control them; the resulting engagements are often considered part of both the Civil War and the American Indian Wars. The remaining Union troops in the New Mexico Territory were concentrated in forts along and near the Rio Grande; the commander of the Union Department of New Mexico, Colonel Edward R.S. Canby, started raising regiments of New Mexico volunteers and militia to replace the regular army units which had been ordered east.

Captain Sherod Hunter, at the head of the Confederate Arizona Rangers, occupied southern Arizona during the spring of 1862. He bore orders from Governor Baylor to lure the Apache into Tucson for peace talks and then to exterminate the adults. Hunter's frontiersmen spent most of their time expelling Union supporters and skirmishing with Federal troops, so the order was never enforced. A detachment of Hunter's force traveled along the Butterfield Overland Mail route and destroyed caches of hay to prevent their use by Union forces; it traveled to within eighty miles of Fort Yuma.

In April 1862, a small party of Confederates moving northwest from Tucson met a Union cavalry patrol near Stanwix Station. The skirmish that followed, in which one Union cavalryman was wounded, is often considered the westernmost engagement of the Civil War. Ultimately, the goal of expanding Confederate influence into southern California and to the Pacific Ocean was never realized. Following the Battle of Picacho Pass at Picacho Peak, about 50 miles (80 km) northwest of Tucson, the lead detachment of Colonel James H. Carleton's California Column drove the Confederates out of Tucson and advanced on Mesilla, the capital of Confederate Arizona. By July the Confederates had retreated to Texas, where they continued to manage the territorial government from El Paso. Carleton's troops later fought the Battle of Apache Pass, during which they were ambushed by Apache warriors led by Cochise and Mangas Coloradas in Arizona's Chiricahua Mountains. Even though the column withstood the Apache attack and subsequently established Fort Bowie to secure the pass, the Californians and the Apache would continue fighting throughout the war and beyond.

The Confederate Arizona Territory, which split off from the rest of the New Mexico Territory in 1861, was the first U.S. incarnation of Arizona, which would come into existence as Arizona Territory in 1863. Confederate Arizona was created by capturing the southern tier of the Union's New Mexico Territory, while the boundary established in 1863 created an Arizona on the west separated from New Mexico on the east.

== Aftermath ==
Peralta, New Mexico, razed in the Battle of Peralta by weapons fire, was rebuilt and is inhabited today. The territorial legislature arranged for a monument commemorating the Union war dead and condemning the Confederacy to be erected in the Santa Fe Plaza.

== See also ==
- New Mexico campaign
- Department of New Mexico
- List of New Mexico Territory Civil War units
