= William Read Scurry =

Confederate States Army general (1821–1864)

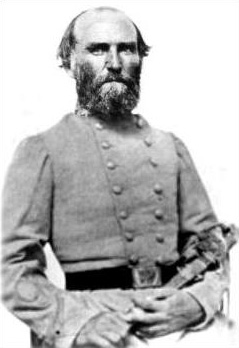
- Born: February 10, 1821; Gallatin, Tennessee, US
- Died: April 30, 1864 (aged 43); Grant County, Arkansas
- Burial place: Texas State Cemetery
- Military career
- Allegiance: United States; Confederate States of America
- Branch: US Army; Confederate States Army
- Service years: 1846 (USA); 1861–1864 (CSA)
- Rank: Major (USA); Brigadier General (CSA)
- Conflicts: American Civil War: New Mexico Campaign; Battle of Valverde Battle of Glorieta Pass: Battle of Mansfield; Battle of Jenkins' Ferry †

William Read Scurry (February 10, 1821 – April 30, 1864) was a Confederate general during the American Civil War.

== Biography ==
Scurry was born in Gallatin, Tennessee. He moved to Texas in 1839 and became a lawyer and district attorney. Scurry was married to Janette (Jeannitte) B. Sutton on December 17, 1846, and had seven children. He represented Red River County in the Ninth Congress of the Republic of Texas in 1844 and 1845 and served in the House of Representatives in 1845, promoting the annexation of Texas to the United States. Enlisting as a private in the Mexican–American War, Scurry rose to the rank of major by July 1846. Afterward, he practiced law in Clinton, Texas, and was co-owner and editor of the Austin State Gazette. In 1856 Scurry became a delegate to the state Democratic nominating convention, and in 1861 he was a delegate to the Secession Convention.

In July 1861, he became a lieutenant colonel in the Fourth Texas Cavalry, part of the Sibley Brigade which launched the New Mexico Campaign at the outset of 1862. He distinguished himself as an officer at the Battle of Valverde, February 21–22, 1862, and as well by commanding the Confederate forces in the Battle of Glorieta Pass, March 26–28, 1862. He was promoted to full colonel on March 28, 1862, and subsequently played a key role in leading the Confederate retreat from New Mexico. He was promoted to brigadier general on September 12, 1862. Along with fellow New Mexico Campaign veterans, he helped recapture Galveston, Texas on January 1, 1863.

Scurry took command of the Third Brigade of Walker's Texas Division in October 1863 and led them into the Battle of Mansfield and Pleasant Hill, April 1864. The Third Brigade then transferred to Arkansas to fight against Gen. Frederick Steele, who was about to invade Texas. Scurry was killed at the Battle of Jenkins' Ferry on April 30, 1864, and was buried in the State Cemetery at Austin, Texas in May 1864. Texas erected a thirteen-foot-high white marble shaft over his grave. Scurry County, Texas, is named in his honor.

== See also ==
- List of American Civil War generals (Confederate)
