= Alexander McRae (American soldier) =

American soldier

Alexander McRae (September 4, 1829 – February 21, 1862) was a U.S. Army officer from North Carolina, who served on the antebellum frontiers in Texas and New Mexico, and fought in the Union Army, being killed in the Battle of Valverde.

== Early life and career ==
Alexander McRae was born in Fayetteville, North Carolina in 1829 to John and Mary McRae.

McRae received an appointment as a Cadet at the United States Military Academy, from July 1, 1847, which he attended until July 1, 1851, when he was graduated 23rd in his class. With it the same day he was promoted in the Army to Brevet Second Lieutenant, and Second Lieutenant, Regiment of Mounted Riflemen.

McRae's first duty was served in the garrison at Jefferson Barracks, Missouri from 1851‑52. He then began frontier duty in Texas, first at Fort Merrill, in 1852. He then was sent to Fort Ewell, engaging in scouting during 1852‑53, then returned to Fort Merrill in 1853‑54 before being sent to Fort Inge, again scouting in 1854‑55, then was assigned to Fort Clark from 1855 to 1856.

In 1856, he conducted recruits to New Mexico Territory and served at Fort Union during 1856‑57, where he received his promotion to first lieutenant, of Mounted Riflemen, January 26, 1857. During 1857 he served at Bent's Fort, Colorado, then escorting the governor of New Mexico Territory. Next he served at Fort Craig from 1857 to 1858.

McRae returned to Fort Union, in 1858, and was in the March to Utah, in 1858. Next he was on recruiting service from 1858 to 1860. He returned to frontier duty at Fort Union, in 1860-1861, engaged in scouting in 1861 then back to Fort Union then sent to Fort Stanton in later 1861, where he received his promotion to captain, Mounted Riflemen, June 10, 1861. He became captain of 3rd Cavalry Regiment, August 3, 1861, when the Mounted Riflemen were redesignated.

== American Civil War ==
At the beginning of the American Civil War, McRae's father wrote urging him to change sides. Nevertheless Captain McRae retained his commission as a U.S. Army officer and served in the Union Army, while his four brothers fought for the Confederacy. In operations of Colonel Edward Canby in the New Mexico Territory, he was given command of an artillery battery of six guns. On February 21, 1862, he was engaged in the Battle of Valverde, where he was wounded twice then killed defending his guns as they were overrun by Confederate Army troops of the 5th Texas Mounted Rifles Regiment. He died at the age of 32, and was buried at Fort Craig.

== Legacy ==
In his official report of the Combat of Valverde, Colonel Canby, wrote:

Among the killed is one, isolated by peculiar circumstances, whose memory deserves notice from a higher authority than mine. Pure in character, upright in conduct, devoted to his profession, and of a loyalty that was deaf to the seductions of family and friends, Captain McRae died, as he had lived, an example of the best and highest qualities that man can possess.

In 1867 his body was exhumed from its grave in New Mexico Territory and carried across the country from Army post to Army post with a hero's escort to be interred at the United States Military Academy Post Cemetery at West Point.
