= Battle of Peralta =

Park of the American Civil War in New Mexico

Coordinates: 34°49′35″N 106°41′20″W

- Part of the Trans-Mississippi Theater of the American Civil War
Date	April 14, 1862
Location	Peralta, New Mexico Territory; now in Valencia County, New Mexico
Result	Union victory; Destruction of Peralta

Belligerents
United States	Confederate States

Commanders and leaders
(United States) Edward Canby	(Confederate States of America) Thomas Green

Strength
2nd New Mexico Infantry; 1st Colorado Infantry	4th Texas Cavalry; 7th Texas Cavalry

Casualties and losses
1 killed 3 wounded	4–6 killed 3 wounded/captured 22 captured

The Battle of Peralta was a minor engagement near the end of Confederate General Henry Hopkins Sibley's 1862 New Mexico Campaign.

== Battle ==
Retreating after the Battle of Glorieta Pass, Confederate troops of the 5th Texas Mounted Volunteers under Colonel Thomas Green camped in the town of Peralta, New Mexico Territory and planned to cross a series of irrigation canals the next day. The rest of the Confederate army was encamped on the other side of the Rio Grande in the town of Los Lunas.

On April 14, the pursuing Union Army forces under Colonel Edward Canby caught up with Green. At dawn, Union cavalry attacked and captured the Confederate wagon train, killing and capturing the guard. The Confederates used the low adobe houses in the town as natural fortifications. Canby captured a Confederate supply train which was then approaching Peralta, and then sent John Chivington and Gabriel R. Paul to surround the Confederates to prevent any forces from reaching Green. The adobe walls and irrigation ditches surrounding the town were stronger than Canby was willing to risk an assault on. Learning of the fighting, Sibley led the 4th and 7th Texas Mounted Rifles across the river. The rival armies battered each other in an artillery duel, until a dust storm blew in and allowed the Confederates to withdraw to the west bank of the Rio Grande, leaving behind a town which had been reduced to rubble.

The Confederates reached Los Lunas at 4 a.m., where they rested for a few hours before continuing their retreat. Canby followed with the Union army, harassing the Confederate column with cavalry.

At Peralta Union forces finally expelled Confederates from the New Mexico Territory and crushed any Rebel hope of accessing gold in Colorado or ports in California.
