= Megan Kate Nelson =

Pulitzer Prize finalist and historian

- Nelson at the 2026 Texas Book Festival
- Website: https://megankatenelson.com/

Megan Kate Nelson is an American author and historian who has focused on environmental history, military history, and the Western United States. She was a finalist for the Pulitzer Prize for History for her book The Three-Cornered War.

== Education ==
Megan Kate Nelson began her studies as an undergraduate at Harvard University, majoring in history and literature. She went on to earn her PhD in American Studies at the University of Iowa.

== Career ==
Before becoming a full-time writer, she taught at Harvard University, Brown University, Cal State Fullerton, MIT, and Texas Tech University.

Her writings have focused on the American West, the Civil War, and the Reconstruction era. In addition to her books, she also has published articles in the New York Times, the Washington Post, Slate, Smithsonian Magazine, Chronicle of Higher Education, Preservation Magazine, and Civil War Times.

== Selected works ==
=== Books ===
- The Westerners: Mythmaking and Belonging on the American Frontier (Scribner, 2026)
- Saving Yellowstone: Exploration and Preservation in Reconstruction America (Scribner, 2022)
- The Three-Cornered War: The Union, the Confederacy, and Native Peoples in the Fight for the West (Scribner, 2020)
- Ruin Nation: Destruction and the American Civil War (University of Georgia Press, 2012)
- Trembling Earth: A Cultural History of the Okefenokee Swamp (University of Georgia Press, 2005)

== Awards and honors ==
- Pulitzer Prize Finalist in 2021 (The Three-Cornered War)
- Reading the West Book Award Longlist in 2021 (The Three-Cornered War)
- Spur Award for Best Historical Nonfiction Book in 2023 (Saving Yellowstone)
- Reading the West Book Award Longlist in 2023 (Saving Yellowstone)
