= New Mexico campaign =

Military operation of the trans-Mississippi theater of the American Civil War

- Part of the American Civil War
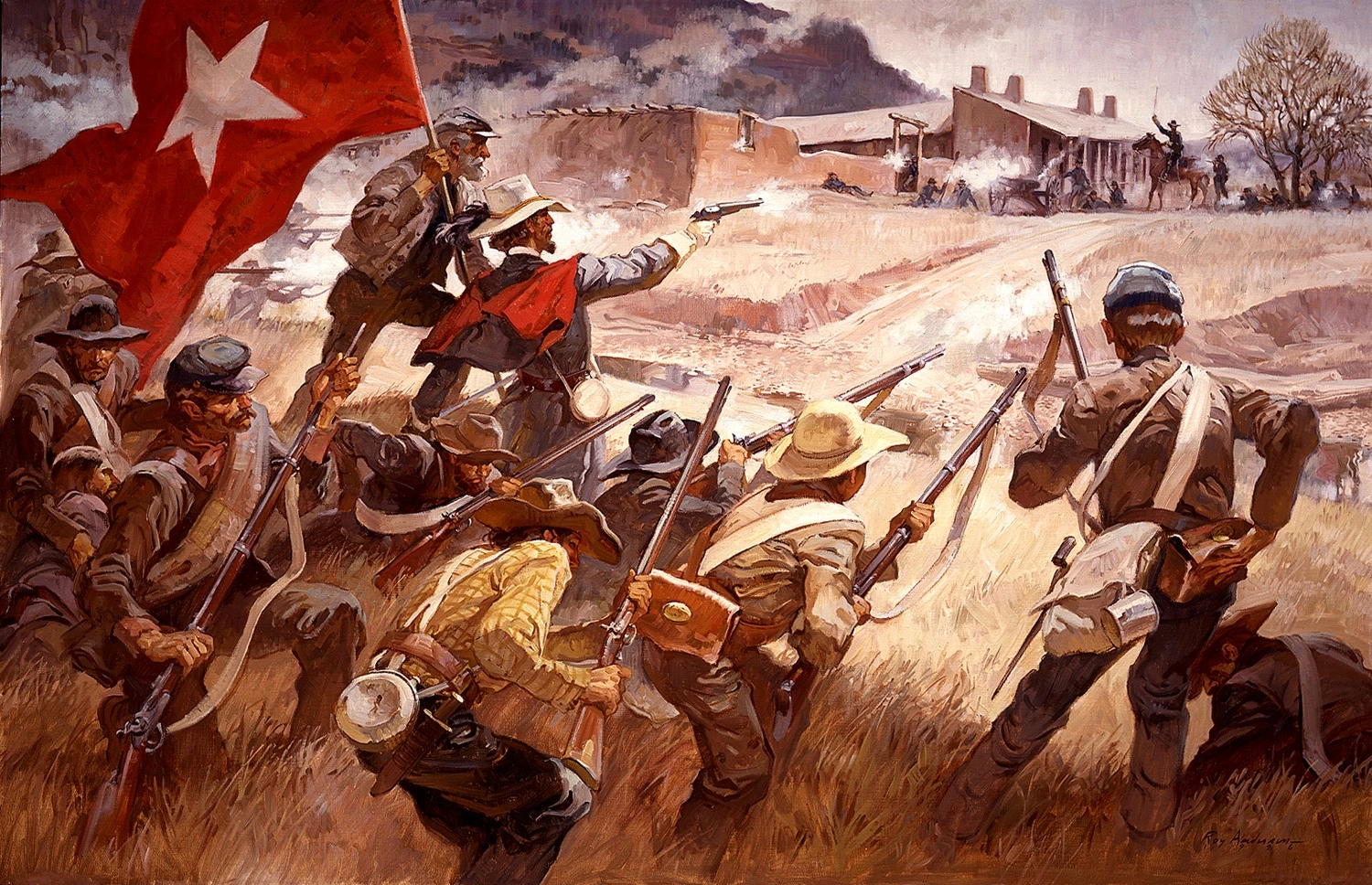
- Depiction of the Battle of Glorieta Pass during the campaign, dubbed the "Gettysburg of the West"
Date	February–April 1862
Location	New Mexico Territory
Result	Confederate tactical victory, Union strategic victory: Confederate retreat from New Mexico Territory; Confederate loss of Confederate Arizona

Belligerents
United States of America: New Mexico Territory; Colorado Territory	Confederate States of America: Confederate Arizona; Confederate Texas

Commanders and leaders
Edward Canby; Isaac Lynde	Henry Hopkins Sibley; Thomas Green

Strength
5,142	2,515

Casualties and losses
~166 killed, ~246 wounded, ~222 missing or captured	~400 killed or wounded, ~500 missing/captured

The New Mexico campaign was a military operation of the trans-Mississippi theater of the American Civil War from February to April 1862 in which Confederate Brigadier General Henry Hopkins Sibley invaded the northern New Mexico Territory in an attempt to gain control of the Southwest, including the gold fields of Colorado and the ports of California. Historians regard the campaign as the most ambitious Confederate attempt to establish control of the American West and to open an additional theater in the war. It was an important campaign in the war's Trans-Mississippi theater, and one of the major events in the history of the New Mexico Territory in the American Civil War.

The Confederates advanced north along the Rio Grande from Fort Bliss in Texas. They won the Battle of Valverde but failed to capture Fort Craig or force the surrender of the main Union Army in the territory. They continued north across the border towards Santa Fe and Fort Union, leaving that Union force in their rear. At Glorieta Pass, the Confederates defeated another Union force from Fort Union, but were forced to retreat following the destruction of the wagon train containing most of their supplies.

Confederate success in the failed campaign would have denied the Union a major source of the gold and silver necessary to finance its war effort, and the Union navy would have had the additional difficulty of attempting to blockade several hundred miles of coastline in the Pacific. A Confederate victory would have also diverted Union troops which, following the invasion, were used to fight Native tribes on the plains and in the Rockies.

== Opposing forces ==
=== Union ===
Union forces in the Department of New Mexico were led by Colonel Edward Canby, who headquartered at Fort Craig. Under his immediate command at the fort were five regiments of New Mexico volunteer infantry, a company of the 2nd Colorado Infantry, two provisional artillery units, eleven companies of the 5th, 7th, and 10th U.S. Infantry, six companies of the 2nd and 3rd U.S. Cavalry, and two regiments New Mexico militia. At Fort Union, under the command of Colonel Gabriel Paul, were the 1st Colorado Infantry, a company of the 2nd Colorado Infantry, a battalion of the 5th U.S. Infantry Regiment, a detachment from the 1st and 3rd U.S. Cavalry, a company of the 4th New Mexico Infantry, and two provisional artillery batteries.

=== Confederate ===
The Confederate Army of New Mexico was led by Brigadier General Henry Hopkins Sibley. His units included the 4th Texas Mounted Rifles and 5th Texas Mounted Rifles (both of which had batteries of mountain howitzers), five companies of the 7th Texas Mounted Rifles, six companies of the 2nd Texas Mounted Rifles with an attached artillery battery, and several companies of Arizona Confederate mounted volunteers. Following his arrival in New Mexico in January, Sibley organized his artillery into a battalion under the command of Captain Trevanion Teel, whom he promoted to major. Five additional companies of the 7th Texas arrived near the end of February and served as the garrison of Fort Thorn at Mesilla.

== Confederate strategy ==
For years, residents in the southern part of the New Mexico Territory had been complaining that the territorial government in Santa Fe was too far away to properly address their concerns. The withdrawal of the Regular army at the beginning of the war confirmed to the residents that they were being abandoned. Secession conventions in Mesilla and Tucson voted to join the territory to the Confederacy in March 1861, and formed militia companies to defend themselves. In July 1861, Lieutenant Colonel John Baylor led a battalion of Texas mounted rifles into the southern portion of the New Mexico Territory, entering Mesilla and repulsing the attack of the Union garrison of Fort Fillmore at the First Battle of Mesilla. The victorious Baylor established the Confederate Territory of Arizona south of the 34th parallel.

The 1862 campaign was a continuation of this strategy formulated by Sibley in a plan presented to Confederate president Jefferson Davis. Sibley's strategy called for an invasion along the eastern side of the Rocky Mountains, seizing the Colorado Territory (then at the height of the Colorado Gold Rush) and Fort Laramie (the most important United States Army garrison along the Oregon Trail), before turning westward to attack mineral-rich Nevada and California. He planned to take minimal supplies along with him, intending to live off the land and to capture the stockpiles of supplies at Union forts and depots along the Santa Fe Trail. Once the territories had been secured, Sibley intended to take the northern Mexican states of Chihuahua, Sonora, and Lower California, either through purchase or by invasion.

== March toward Santa Fe ==
=== Sibley's advance ===
On December 20, 1861, General Sibley, in command of the Army of New Mexico, issued a proclamation taking possession of New Mexico in the name of the Confederate States. He called on the citizens to abandon their allegiance to the Union and to join the Confederacy, warning that those "who co-operate with the enemy will be treated accordingly, and must be prepared to share their fate." In February 1862, Sibley advanced northward from Fort Thorn up the valley of the Rio Grande, toward the territorial capital of Santa Fe and the Union storehouses at Fort Union. Along the way, Sibley detached 54 men to occupy Tucson. The Confederate advance followed the west bank of the river via Fort Craig, which was garrisoned by a 3,800-man Union force under Canby. Knowing he could not leave such a large Union force behind him as he advanced, Sibley attempted to lure the Union forces out into battle on favorable terms.

On February 19, Sibley camped at the sandhills east of the fort with the intention of cutting the Union lines of communications with Santa Fe. On February 20, the Union forces advanced from the fort but were hit with heavy Confederate artillery and were forced to retreat. The next day the Confederates marched to Valverde Ford, six miles (9.7 km) north of the fort, in an attempt to outflank the Union forces. Canby attacked, but the Union forces were driven back by the Confederates under Colonel Thomas Green, who took command after Sibley was indisposed (and possibly drunk). Canby's forces retreated to Fort Craig but refused to surrender.

Since he had only enough rations for three days, Sibley could not attempt a siege nor retreat back to Mesilla. Instead, he chose to disengage from the fort and continued slowly northward towards Santa Fe, on the other side of the border in New Mexico Territory, hoping to reach the supplies located there and also to cut Fort Craig's lines of supplies and communications. Due to the loss of horses at Valverde, the 4th Texas had to be dismounted, with the remaining horses, already in a weakened state, distributed among the other units. They also had lost much of their transportation in the battle at Valverde, causing them to carry the wounded. All this caused the column to travel slower than it could have. Canby meanwhile attempted to trap Sibley's army between his own force and Fort Union. He disbanded his militia and most of the volunteer units, and sent most of his mounted units northward to act as partisans and to "obstruct [Sibley's] movements if he should advance, and cut off his supplies, by removing from his route the cattle, grain, and other supplies in private hands that would aid him in sustaining his force."

Starting on February 23, the Confederate forces reached Albuquerque on March 2 and Santa Fe on March 13, but due to their slow advance they failed to capture most of the Union supplies located at those cities. The slow advance also allowed reinforcements from Colorado under the command of Colonel John Slough to reach Fort Union, then under Paul's command. Since he had been commissioned colonel before Paul was commissioned the same rank, Slough claimed seniority and took command of the fort. Canby had already ordered Paul to "not move from Fort Union to meet me until I advise you of the route and point of junction." After learning of the change in command, Canby told Slough to "advise me of your plans and movements, that I may cooperate." He also instructed Slough to "harass the enemy by partisan operations. Obstruct his movements and cut off his supplies." Slough advanced with 1,342 men from the fort's garrison.

The Union and Confederate forces met at the Battle of Glorieta Pass on March 28. The Confederates were able to push the Union force through the pass, but had to retreat following the destruction of their wagon train, which contained nearly all of their supplies and ammunition. Sibley pulled his army back to Albuquerque to await reinforcements from Texas. Slough, receiving orders from Canby to return immediately to Fort Union, also retreated, fearing a court martial if he disobeyed the order. Once he arrived at the fort, he resigned his commission and returned to Colorado, leaving Lieutenant Colonel Samuel Tappan in command of the regiment and Paul once again in command of the fort.

=== Sibley's retreat ===
Canby initially ordered the Union force to retreat back to Fort Union, but after discovering the weakness of the Confederates he ordered a concentration of Union forces; small garrisons were left at Forts Craig and Union, and the main forces were to rendezvous near Albuquerque. With limited supplies and ammunition and outnumbered, Sibley chose to retreat to Texas, leaving Albuquerque on April 12 after a small fight a few days earlier. On April 14, Canby encountered the Confederates at Peralta, where the armies skirmished until 2:00 p.m. when a sandstorm permitted the Confederates to withdraw to the west bank.

Cut off from retreat down the east bank by Union forces, Sibley's army was forced to retreat down the west bank or through the mountains to the west in search of food and water, during which hundreds of Confederates straggled and fell behind. During the retreat, looting, destruction and confiscation of food, and forage by the desperate Confederate soldiers drove New Mexican citizens to resistance along the line of march down the west bank of the Rio Grande. After reaching Mesilla the retreat continued to Franklin (El Paso) and then to San Antonio. At Socorro, New Mexico a small confederate unit of four men under a Lt. Simmons was captured by Union Scout Captain "Paddy" Grayson and one man. (Of the five men 1 confederate was killed trying to escape.)

A rearguard of four companies of the 7th Texas Mounted Rifles and several companies of Arizona Confederates (consolidated under the command of Lieutenant Colonel Philemon Herbert as the 1st Arizona Mounted Rifles Battalion) was left at Fort Thorn, commanded by Colonel William Steele.

With the advance of the California Column closing in from the west, and General Edward Canby's Army approaching from the north, guerillas from the Mesilla area rose against the 7th Texas Mounted Rifles while the 1st Arizona Mounted Rifles left to garrison the Mesilla Valley. The Second Battle of Mesilla was a skirmish fought in the desert near Mesilla on July 1, 1862, between Confederate Arizona rebels and pro Union New Mexican militia. The engagement ended with a Union victory and with the threat of the more numerous Union forces closing in. The rebels withdrew from Mesilla, retreating into Texas in early July.

== Aftermath ==
Following the Confederate retreat, units from the Union California Column under the command of Colonel James Carleton occupied several forts in western Texas. Canby was promoted to brigadier general and reassigned to the eastern region. He was succeeded as commander of the department by Carleton, who was also promoted to brigadier general. Men from the New Mexico volunteers were formed into the 1st New Mexico Cavalry with Kit Carson in command; the regiment spent the rest of the war fighting Native tribes in the territory.

Although the Confederates continued to consider Arizona part of the Confederacy and made several plans for another invasion, they were never able to put their plans into execution. Sibley's brigade would be called by many the "Arizona Brigade" and continued to serve in various areas in Texas and Louisiana during the remainder of the war. Sibley was eventually demoted to managing supply trains in 1863.

== Battlefields today ==
Approximately 678 acres (2.74 km^{2}) of the Glorieta Pass Battlefield is today protected within the Pecos National Historical Park, and the National Park Service allows access on the park's Civil War sites only to permit-holders and guided tours. There are numerous exposition signs and exhibits around the park and along nearby roads including Interstate 25, which parallels the Santa Fe National Historic Trail through Glorieta Pass.

The Valverde battlefield was commemorated by a historical marker along a nearby highway in the corridor known as the Camino Real de Tierra Adentro, now a National Historic Trail.

The Battle of Peralta (loosely depicted in The Good, the Bad and the Ugly) was commemorated by a state historical marker at the north end of the village, now surrounded by suburban development from metropolitan Albuquerque.

The Battle of Albuquerque was memorialized on the city's Old Town Plaza including plaques and cannons.

The First and Second Battle of Mesilla have a sign on the Plaza in historic Mesilla, which was the capital of the Confederate Arizona territory during the Civil War but is now part of metropolitan Las Cruces in far southern New Mexico.

== Campaign legacy ==
- The name of the town of Albuquerque, Texas, was inspired by campaign members' return home to the area following the war.

== See also ==
- Attacks on the United States
