= Battle of Valverde =

1862 battle of the American Civil War

- Part of the American Civil War
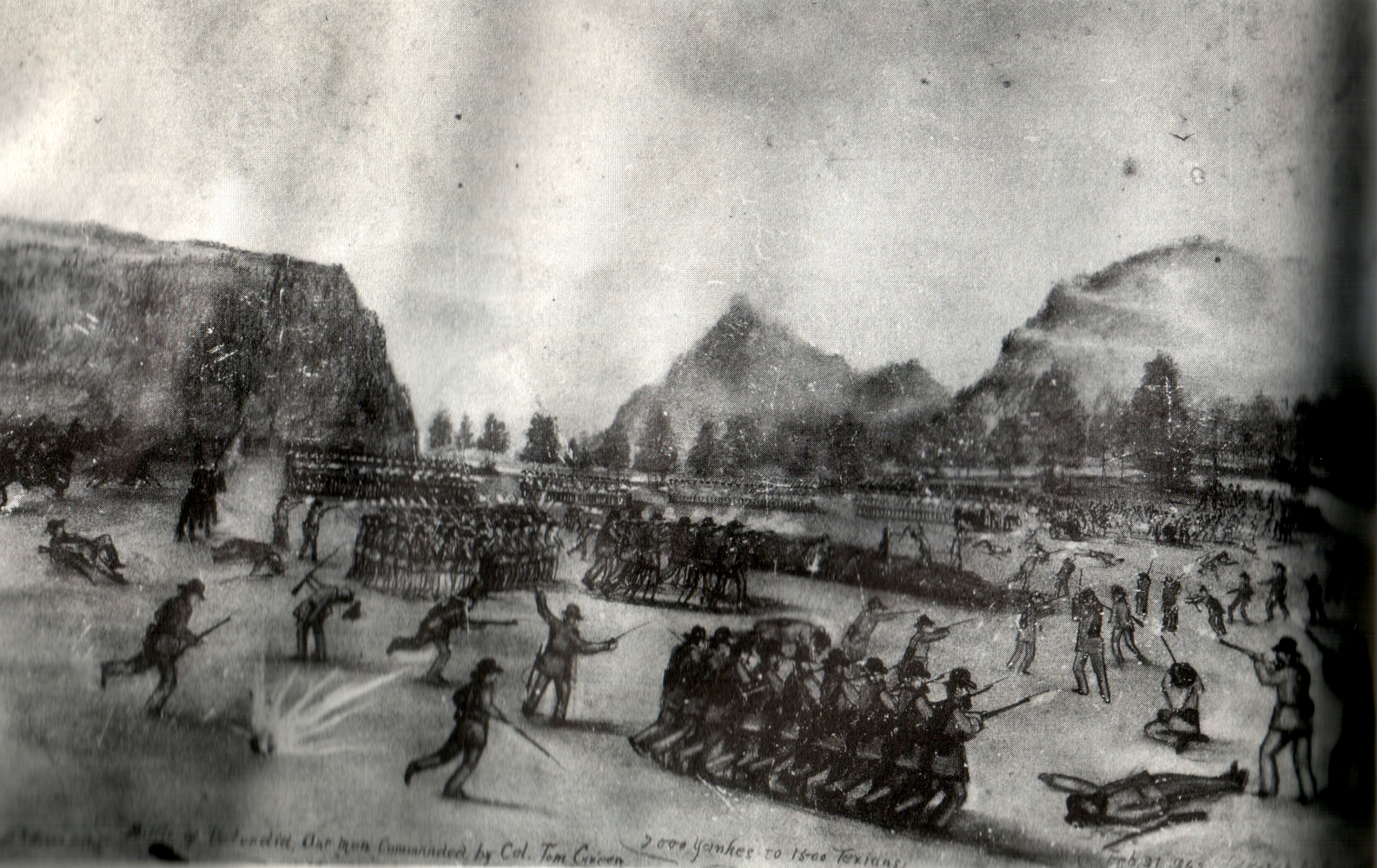
Date	February 20–21, 1862
Location	Socorro County, New Mexico 33°38′00″N 107°00′41″W
Result	Confederate victory

Belligerents
United States	(Confederate States of America) Confederate States

Commanders and leaders
(United States) Edward Canby (United States) Alexander McRae †	(Confederate States of America) Henry Hopkins Sibley (Confederate States of America) Thomas Green

Units involved
1st and 3rd U.S. Cavalry; 5th, 7th and 10th U.S. Infantry; McRae's Battery (Artillery); 2nd Colorado Infantry; 1st, 2nd, 3rd, 4th and 5th New Mexico Infantry; Graydon's Independent Cavalry Company; 1st and 2nd New; Mexico Militia	2nd, 4th, 5th and 7th Texas Cavalry

Strength
Department of New Mexico: 3,000	Army of New Mexico: 2,590

Casualties and losses
111 killed 160 wounded 204 captured or missing (mostly deserters); 6 artillery pieces captured Total: 475	71 killed 157 wounded 1 missing Total: 229

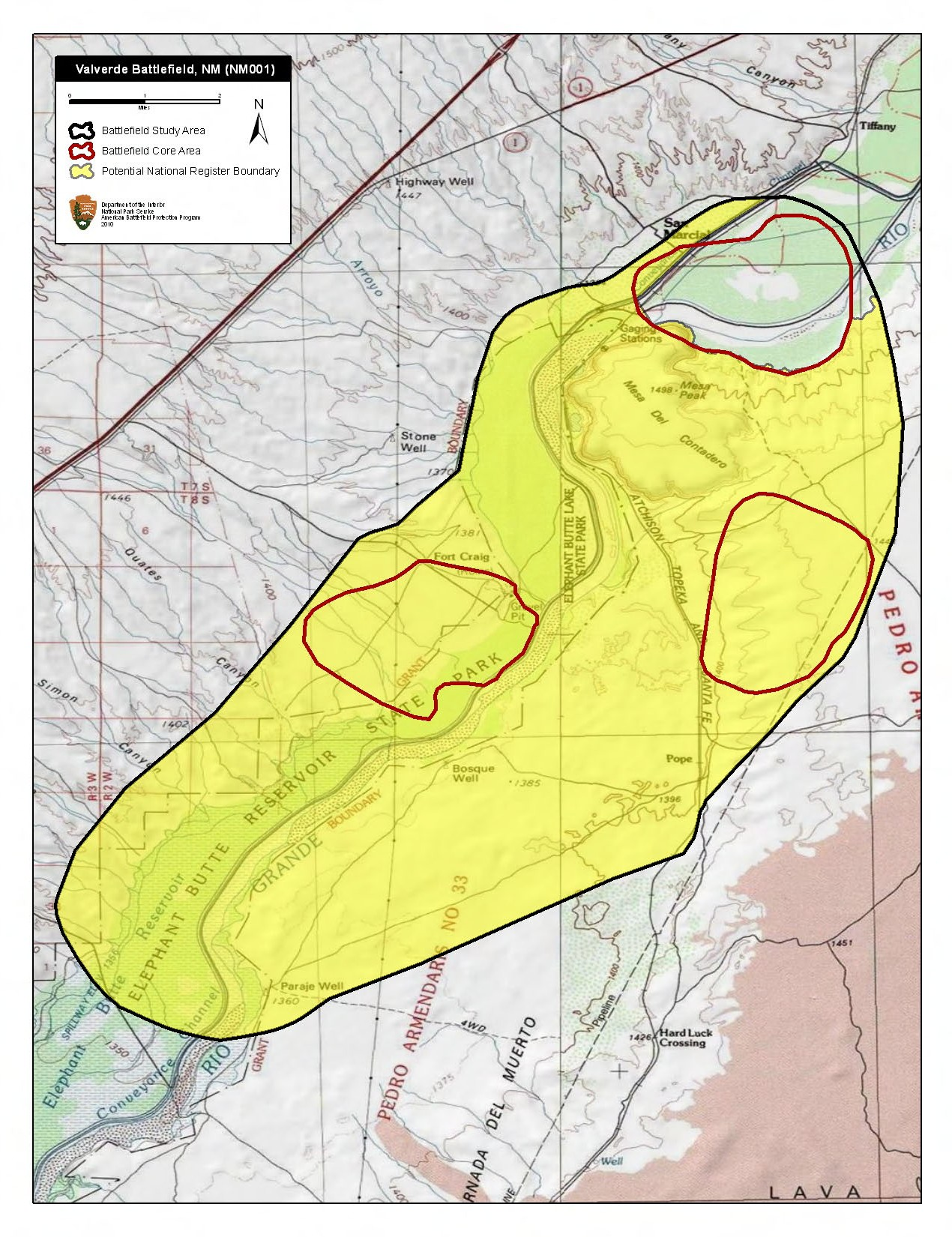
Map of Valverde Battlefield core and study areas by the American Battlefield Protection Program

The Battle of Valverde, also known as the Battle of Valverde Ford, was fought from February 20 to 21, 1862, near the town of Val Verde at a ford of the Rio Grande in Union-held New Mexico Territory, in what is today the state of New Mexico. It is considered a major Confederate success in the New Mexico Campaign of the American Civil War, despite the invading force abandoning the field. The belligerents were Confederate cavalry from Texas and several companies of Arizona militia versus U.S. Army regulars and Union volunteers from northern New Mexico Territory and the Colorado Territory.

== Background ==
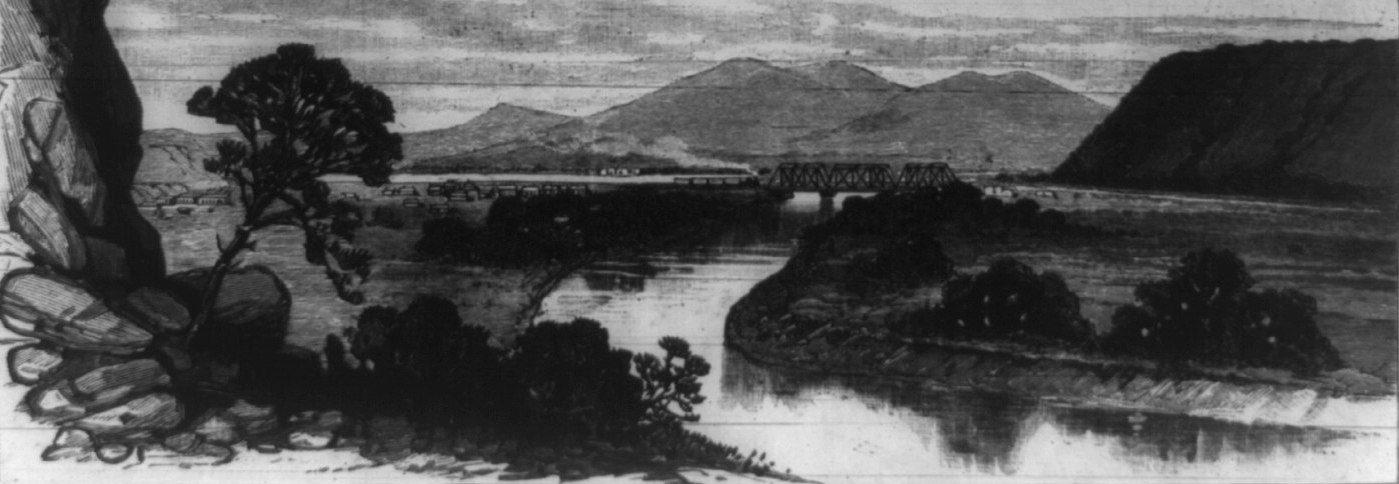
Scene of the old battleground of Valverde, on the Rio Grande, as it looked in 1885

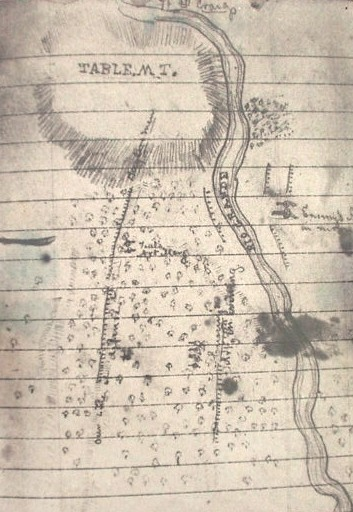
Soldier's sketch of the Battle of Valverde

Confederate brigadier general Henry Hopkins Sibley envisioned invading New Mexico with his army, defeating Union forces, capturing the capital city of Santa Fe, and then marching westward to conquer California for the Confederacy. Sibley's first step was to gather an army in El Paso, Texas, and lead it north through Confederate Arizona to Fort Thorn. From there he would advance along the Rio Grande, avoiding the desert of the Jornada del Muerto, with the objective of capturing Fort Craig and the supplies in the fort and defeating the Federal army under Colonel Edward Canby. On January 3, 1862, Sibley left El Paso with three regiments and one partial regiment of mounted Texans comprising 2,510 officers and men. Fort Craig, 140 miles (225 km) north of El Paso, was the major obstacle in his path. Canby awaited him there with 3,800 men of whom most were infantry. Only 1,200 of Canby's men were seasoned soldiers. The remainder consisted of 2,000 New Mexican volunteers, 100 Colorado volunteers, and 500 militia. Kit Carson commanded the First Regiment of New Mexican volunteers.

== Opposing forces ==
=== Union forces ===
Department of New Mexico – Col. Edward Canby

- Regular cavalry
  - 1st U.S. Cavalry Regiment (2 companies) – Cpt. Richard Lord
  - 3rd U.S. Cavalry Regiment (5 companies) – Maj. Thomas Duncan
- Regular infantry
  - 5th U.S. Infantry Regiment (5 companies) – Cpt. Benjamin Wingate
  - 7th U.S. Infantry Regiment (3 companies) & 10th US Infantry (3 companies) – Cpt. Peter Plympton
- Artillery
  - McRae's Battery (formed from elements of 3rd Cavalry) – Cpt. Alexander McRae (North Carolina)
- Colorado volunteers
  - B Company, 2nd Colorado Infantry Regiment – Cpt. Theodore Dodd
- New Mexico volunteers
  - 1st New Mexico Infantry Regiment – Col. Kit Carson
  - 2nd New Mexico Infantry Regiment – Col. Miguel E. Pino
  - 3rd New Mexico Infantry Regiment – Col. José Gallegos
  - 4th New Mexico Infantry Regiment – Col. Gabriel R. Paul
  - 5th New Mexico Infantry Regiment – Col. Benjamin S. Roberts
  - Graydon's Independent Cavalry Company – Cpt. James Graydon
- New Mexico militia
  - 1st Regiment – Col. Manuel Armijo
  - 2nd Regiment – Col. Nicolas Pino

=== Confederate forces ===
Army of New Mexico – BG. Henry Hopkins Sibley

- 2nd Texas Mounted Rifle Battalion – Maj. Charles L. Pyron
- 4th Texas Cavalry Regiment – Ltc. William Read Scurry
- 5th Texas Cavalry Regiment – Col. Thomas Green
- 7th Texas Cavalry Regiment – Ltc. John Sutton
- Provisional Artillery Battalion (formed from elements of 2nd, 4th and 5th Texas) – Cpt. Trevanion Teel

== Prelude ==
Sibley led his brigade to within fifteen miles south of Fort Craig during the evening of February 13. Judging the fort to be too strong to be taken by assault, Sibley deployed his brigade in a line for the next three days, hoping to lure the Federals into the open, but Canby, not trusting his volunteer troops, refused to attack.

As they were down to a few days' rations, the Confederates could not wait indefinitely, so at a council of war on the 18th, Sibley ordered the army to cross the Rio Grande and move up the eastern side of the river to the ford near Valverde, six miles north of Fort Craig, hoping to cut Union communications between the fort and their headquarters in Santa Fe.

By the 20th, the Confederate army, under cover of the hills between it and the river, was opposite Fort Craig. Confederate Col. Thomas Green attempted to place artillery on the heights overlooking the river and fort, but Canby had anticipated the move, forcing the Texans to make a dry camp (that is, a camp with no source of fresh water) on the night of the 20th. About midnight, Union Captain James Graydon tried to blow up a few Rebel picket posts by sending mules loaded with barrels of fused gunpowder into the Confederate lines, but the faithful old army mules wandered back toward the Union camp before blowing to bits. Although the only casualties were two mules, the explosions stampeded a herd of Confederate beef cattle and horses into the Union's lines, depriving Green's troops of some much-needed provisions and horses.

== Battle ==
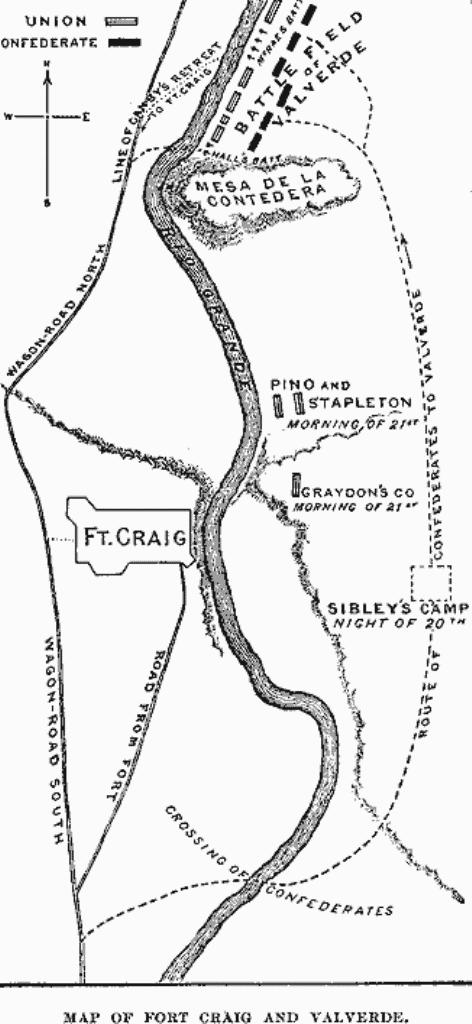
A map of the battle and the surrounding area including Fort Craig

The next morning, February 21, Sibley sent an advance party consisting of four companies of the 2nd Texas Mounted Rifles under the command of Major Charles Pyron to scout ahead to the Valverde ford, with the 4th Texas Mounted Rifles under Lieutenant Colonel William Read Scurry following close behind. The rest of the brigade remained in camp, intending to follow later.

Union scouts informed Canby of the Confederate movements towards the north. Canby then sent a mixed force of infantry, cavalry, and artillery to the ford under the command of Colonel Benjamin S. Roberts of the 5th New Mexico Infantry Regiment. The infantry and artillery slowed the column down, so Roberts sent Major Thomas Duncan ahead with the cavalry to secure the ford. Following Roberts' departure, Canby sent additional reinforcements from the fort's garrison, and assigned several companies of New Mexico volunteers to "watch the movements of the enemy, threaten his flanks and rear, and impede his movements as much as possible."

When the Confederates under Pyron arrived at the eastern side of Valverde ford they found that Union forces were already there blocking their passage. Pyron sent for reinforcements from the 4th Texas while his men took cover in an old riverbed, which served as an excellent defensive position. At first, despite having a numerical advantage, the Union cavalry deployed in a skirmish line instead of trying to drive the Confederates out of their position. This forced the Union artillery to remain on the western bank of the Rio Grande.

When Scurry arrived, he deployed his regiment to Pyron's right, with the regimental artillery on the Confederate left. Although they had gained a numerical superiority, the Confederates were mostly armed with short range shotguns and pistols, which could not reach the Union positions three hundred yards away; the Confederate howitzers also could not reach the Union artillery on the far bank of the river. Meanwhile, Canby ordered most of the remaining garrison at Fort Craig to march to Valverde, leaving behind some militia to guard the fort. When he arrived, Canby moved most of his command, including the artillery, to the eastern bank, leaving the First New Mexico Volunteers under Carson and the Second New Mexico Volunteers under Colonel Miguel Piño on the western bank as a reserve.

By early afternoon, the remainder of the Confederate force, the 5th Texas Mounted Rifles under Colonel Thomas Green and a battalion of the 7th Texas Mounted Rifles under Lieutenant Colonel John Sutton, arrived at the battlefield, much in need of water and denied access to the river by the defending Union forces. Sibley, who during the morning had remained with the wagons, relinquished command of the brigade and Green took over, who then handed command of the 5th Texas over to Major Samuel Lockridge. Around 2:00 pm, Green authorized a lancer company to attempt a charge on what they thought was an inexperienced New Mexico company on the Union extreme right; however, the Union soldiers turned out to be a Colorado company called "Pike's Peakers" which was able to defeat the charge without breaking. Twenty of the lancers were killed or wounded during the charge, with almost all of the horses disabled or killed as well. When it returned to the Confederate line, the lancer company rearmed itself with pistols and shotguns and continued fighting in the battle. This was the first and last lancer charge of the American Civil War. Later an lone Pike's Peaker was isolated and loading his gun when a shot from a rebel went by him. The soldier was not really paying attention to the gunfire, when the same rebel suddenly jumped up from his cover and fired six more shots from his revolver, none of them hitting the Coloradan. The rebel noticing that all the shots missed he shouted that he surrenders with the Pike's Peaker responded with "That be Dead", and "You've had six shots at me, and I am bound to drop you with one, for making such a dead fizzle of it." Being true to his words he'd raised his rifle and open fire hitting the rebel.

By 4:00 p.m., the Union appeared to have the advantage in the battle. Canby decided that a massive frontal assault would fail and instead decided to attack the Confederate left; to do so, he ordered one of his batteries on his right to redeploy closer to the Confederate line and moved several companies to his right, including Carson's First New Mexico Regiment which crossed the river and took its place in line. However, this repositioning of the troops weakened the center of the Union line and the battery on Canby's left. Hoping to stall the Union attack, Green ordered Major Henry Raguet to attack the Union right with his battalion; this attack was repulsed by frontal fire and a flank attack from the 1st New Mexico, and the Union right advanced after the retreating Confederates. When some of the Union soldier's ammunition ran low they begin to throw stones and other objects at the rebels.

At this time, Green ordered the Confederate right wing under the command of Scurry to charge the Union center and the battery on its left; the attack force of 750 men was arranged into three successive waves. The Confederates were motivated, in large part, by their desperate need for water which could only be reached by dislodging the Union troops blocking their access to the Rio Grande. Lockridge was mortally wounded during the attack. The Federals countered with a cavalry charge, but the main Confederate force continued to press their assault on Canby's left flank. Union regulars and men of Santiago Hubbel's company of New Mexican volunteers fought fiercely in the defense of McRae's battery. Eventually, the large Confederate charge was able to capture the six artillery pieces and break the Union battle line. Captain Alexander McCrae was killed during the charge. Many Union officers believed the guns could be retaken, such as Captain Rafael Chacon and Lieutenant Willaim W. Mills but things took a turn for the worse when Canby ordered an early retreat believing the battle to be lost. Sibley was about to order another attack, when Canby sent a white flag asking for a truce to remove the bodies of the dead and wounded, to which Sibley agreed. Canby managed to reorganize his men, minus about 200 deserters from among the New Mexico volunteers, and ordered a retreat back to Fort Craig leaving the road northward toward Santa Fe open to the Confederates.

== Aftermath ==
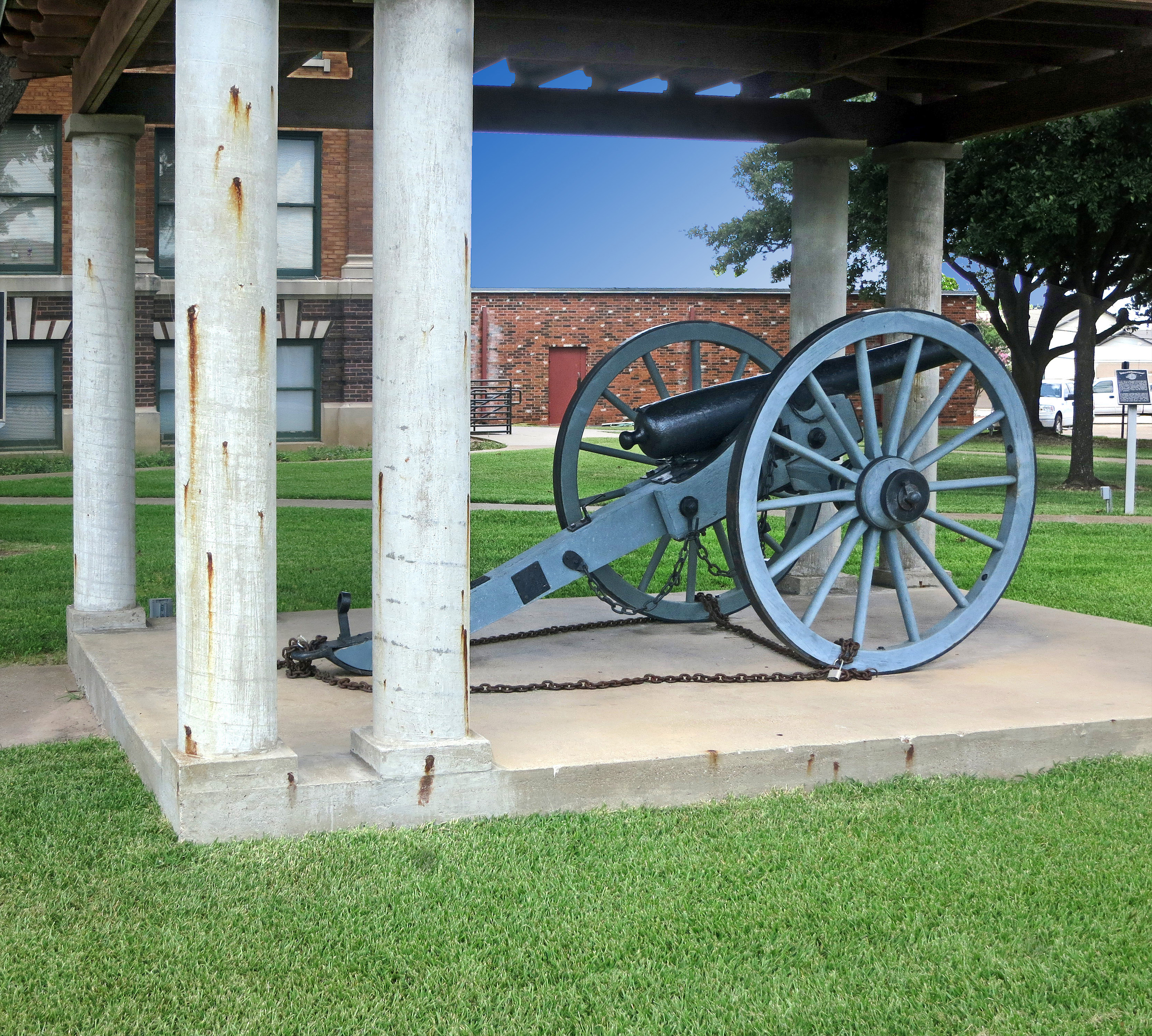
Val Verde Battery, CSA cannon

Left in possession of the battlefield, the Confederates gained a victory but had suffered substantial casualties, reporting 71 killed, 157 wounded, and one missing out of 2,590 men. Owing to the strength of the fort's walls, Sibley decided to abandon his attempt to capture the fort, thus ceding the battlefield back to Union control, and instead continued northwards towards Albuquerque and Santa Fe, where he hoped to capture much-needed supplies. However, he was severely hampered by the losses in horses and mules from the battle, which forced him to dismount the 4th Texas as infantry and to destroy some supplies and wagons.

Canby reported that his forces had 3 officers and 65 men killed, 3 officers and 157 men wounded, 1 officer and 35 men missing for a total of 264. Later counts point to the actual tally closer to 111 Killed and 160 wounded over the course of the battle and its aftermath. He also had additional missing and deserters, mostly deserters, thus suffering a 16 percent casualty rate, including deserters, of 432 of 2,800 men engaged. Considering himself to be outnumbered, he chose not to pursue Sibley, instead sending mounted detachments of New Mexico volunteers against the Confederates' rear for harassment and orders to Albuquerque and Santa Fe to destroy all supply depots and other means the invaders might support themselves. He would remain with the main body at Fort Craig to cut off the Confederates' supply line and to intercept reinforcements for Sibley, eventually planning to pin the main Confederate body between himself and Union reinforcements from Fort Union.

Neither Sibley nor Canby received high marks for their generalship during the battle. Sibley was drunk and ill and spent most of the day riding in an ambulance. Colonel Green was the de facto commander, and it was his aggressive attack on Canby's center and left that won the battle. Canby blamed the New Mexican volunteers, mostly Hispanics, for his loss—but his decision to reinforce his right while weakening his center and left was the real cause of the Union defeat. On Canby's right wing, Kit Carson's regiment of New Mexican volunteers saw only limited action but comported itself well. The volunteers were advancing and thought they were winning the battle. They were incredulous when Canby gave the order to retreat.

The battle represented Canby's low point in his military career and Sibley's high point. The two men would go in opposite directions in terms of reputation after the battle. It was rumored following the battle that the two commanders of these battles, Canby and Sibley, who had been allies and trained together earlier, were actually brothers-in-law. However, research revealed little if any evidence that they were related by marriage.
