= Fort Craig =

United States historic place in New Mexico

- U.S. National Register of Historic Places
- NM State Register of Cultural Properties
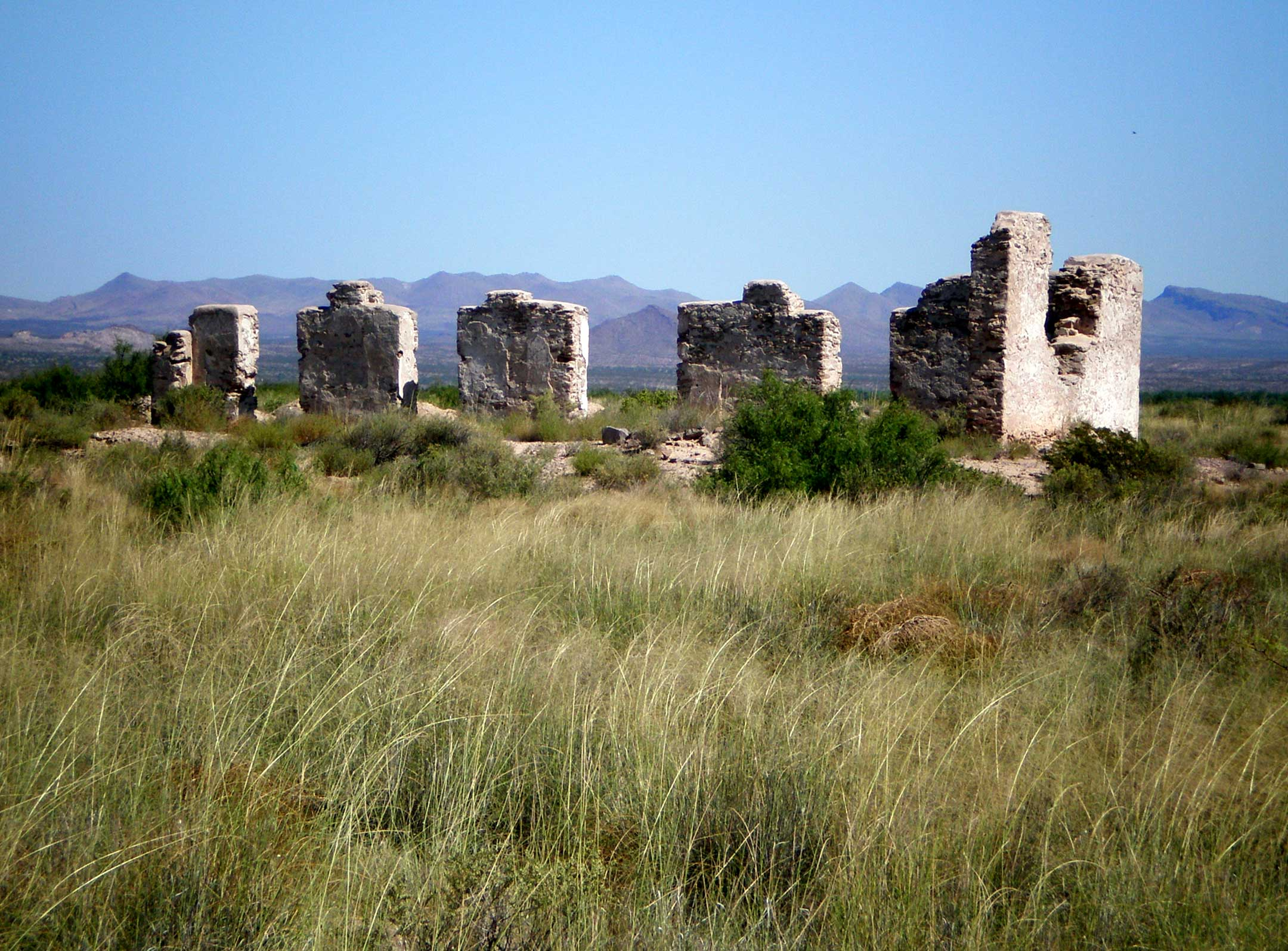

- Location within New Mexico Location within the United States
- Nearest city: Socorro, New Mexico
- Coordinates: 33°38′25″N 107°0′46″W
- Area: 15 acres (6.1 ha)
- Built: 1854
- Website: Fort Craig Historic Site
- NRHP reference No.: 70000414
- NMSRCP No.: 46

Significant dates
- Added to NRHP: October 15, 1970
- Designated NMSRCP: March 21, 1969

Fort Craig was a U.S. Army fort located along El Camino Real de Tierra Adentro, near Elephant Butte Lake State Park and the Rio Grande in Socorro County, New Mexico.

The Fort Craig site was approximately 1,050 feet east–west by 600 feet north–south (320 by 180 m) and covered 40 acres (16 hectares).

== History ==
=== Before Fort Craig ===
The 1848 Treaty of Guadalupe Hidalgo called for the construction of a series of forts along the new boundaries between Mexico and the United States. Apaches and other Native American groups were reportedly harassing settlers and travelers on both sides of the border. The attacks by the tribes from U.S. territory into Mexico was a problem the U.S. government was obligated to address under the treaty.

In 1849, an initial garrison was established at Socorro, New Mexico, whose name can be translated as "safety." A fort called Fort Conrad was then established in 1851 on the west bank of the Rio Grande near Valverde Creek. This was near the north end of the Jornada del Muerto, which was an especially dangerous segment of the major route known as the Camino Real de Tierra Adentro. Although it was an ideal location from which to launch military campaigns against the Apache and Navajo, Fort Conrad was beset by construction problems and was under constant threat of flash floods, so it operated for only a short while until a replacement was built several miles away.

=== Establishment ===
In 1853, the 3rd U.S. Infantry Regiment began constructing a new fort on a bluff nine miles downriver from Fort Conrad. The new fort was named in honor of Captain Louis S. Craig, an officer in the Mexican–American War who had been murdered by deserters in California in 1852. The new fort was garrisoned in 1854 with troops transferred from Fort Conrad.

Life at remote Fort Craig was uncomfortable and lonely at best and deadly at worst. The buildings were a constant source of misery to the soldiers, and records reveal litanies of complaints about leaky roofs, crumbling walls and chimneys, crowded conditions and filth from crumbling dirt roofs and muddy floors.

=== Civil War ===
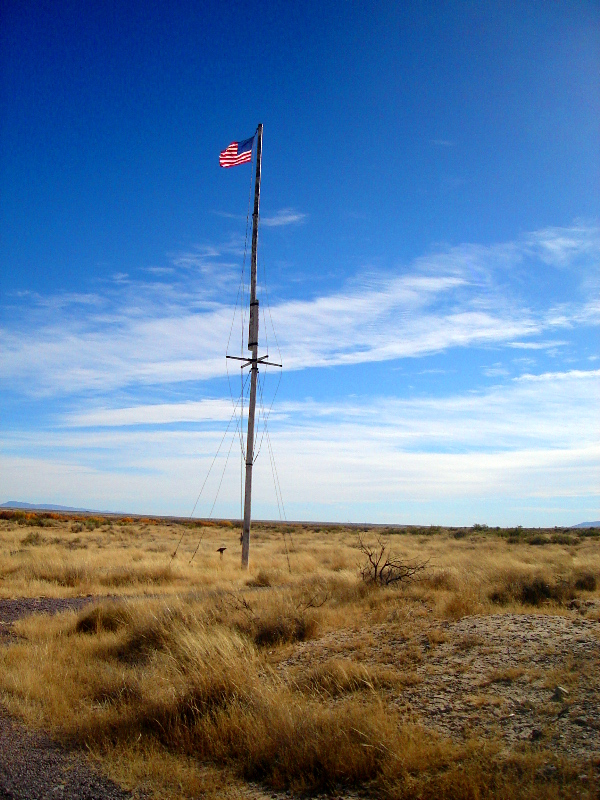
Flagpole at Fort Craig

By July 1861, Fort Craig had become the largest fort in the Southwest, with over 2,000 soldiers. That same year, several regiments of New Mexico Volunteers were established to handle the new threat posed by the Confederate Army of New Mexico.

In February 1862, all five regiments of New Mexico Volunteers were sent south from Fort Union to reinforce Fort Craig and to wait for the Confederate advance up the Rio Grande.

After capturing several military installations in the newly established Confederate Territory of Arizona, Brigadier General Sibley led his enthusiastic but poorly equipped brigade of about 2,500 Confederate Army of New Mexico men. On February 7, 1862, the Army of New Mexico left Fort Fillmore and headed north towards Fort Craig, but marched well around the fort after the Union Army refused to do battle on the plain in front of the fort.

On Fort Craig's massive gravel bastions were mounted "Quaker guns" (wooden fake cannons) with empty soldiers' caps alongside the real cannons and real Union troops. This impressive ruse squelched Sibley's plans for a direct assault on Fort Craig. Furthermore, Sibley did not have the heavy artillery necessary for a siege against the heavily fortified and defended fort.

On February 21, 1862, the Union troops led by Colonel Edward Canby and the Confederate Army of New Mexico of Brigadier General Sibley first met at the Battle of Valverde, a crossing of the Rio Grande just north of the fort. Both sides took heavy casualties. At the end of the day, the Confederates held the field of battle, but the Union still held Fort Craig.

The Battle of Valverde is considered a Confederate victory. However, the New Mexico Volunteers, under the command of Colonel Miguel Pino, found the Confederates' lightly guarded supply wagons and burned them. Sibley was forced to march further north without the supplies he had hoped to take from Fort Craig. On February 23, 1862, the Confederate forces marched around the Union Army and headed for Albuquerque.

=== Indian Wars ===
Between 1863 and 1865, Fort Craig was headquarters for U.S. Army campaigns against the Gila and Mimbres Apaches.

Fort Craig was permanently abandoned in 1885.

Fort Craig was referenced on page 208 in Dee Brown's book “Bury My Heart at Wounded Knee”.

== Fort Craig Historic Site ==
The BLM runs a visitor center at the Fort Craig Historic Site, located 105 miles (170 km) north of Las Cruces and 32 miles (52 km) south of Socorro. It is between Exits 115 and 124 off Interstate 25 which parallels the old Camino Real de Tierra Adentro, now a National Historic Trail.

A 1958 Hollywood movie Western titled Fort Massacre was set in 1879 around "Fort Crane," a fictional analogue for Fort Craig.

In 1894, Fort Craig was sold at auction to the only bidder, the Valverde Land and Irrigation Company. Fort Craig was listed on the National Register of Historic Places in 1970. The property was eventually donated to Archaeological Conservancy by the Oppenheimer family and transferred to the Bureau of Land Management in 1981.

Around 2004, it emerged that 20 bodies had been looted from the cemetery at Fort Craig, evidently by a collector of military memorabilia. To prevent further looting, 67 more sets of remains were exhumed by Federal archaeologists for reinterment at Santa Fe National Cemetery. in 2007.

== See also ==
- National Register of Historic Places listings in Socorro County, New Mexico
