= Henry Hopkins Sibley =

American military leader (1816–1886)

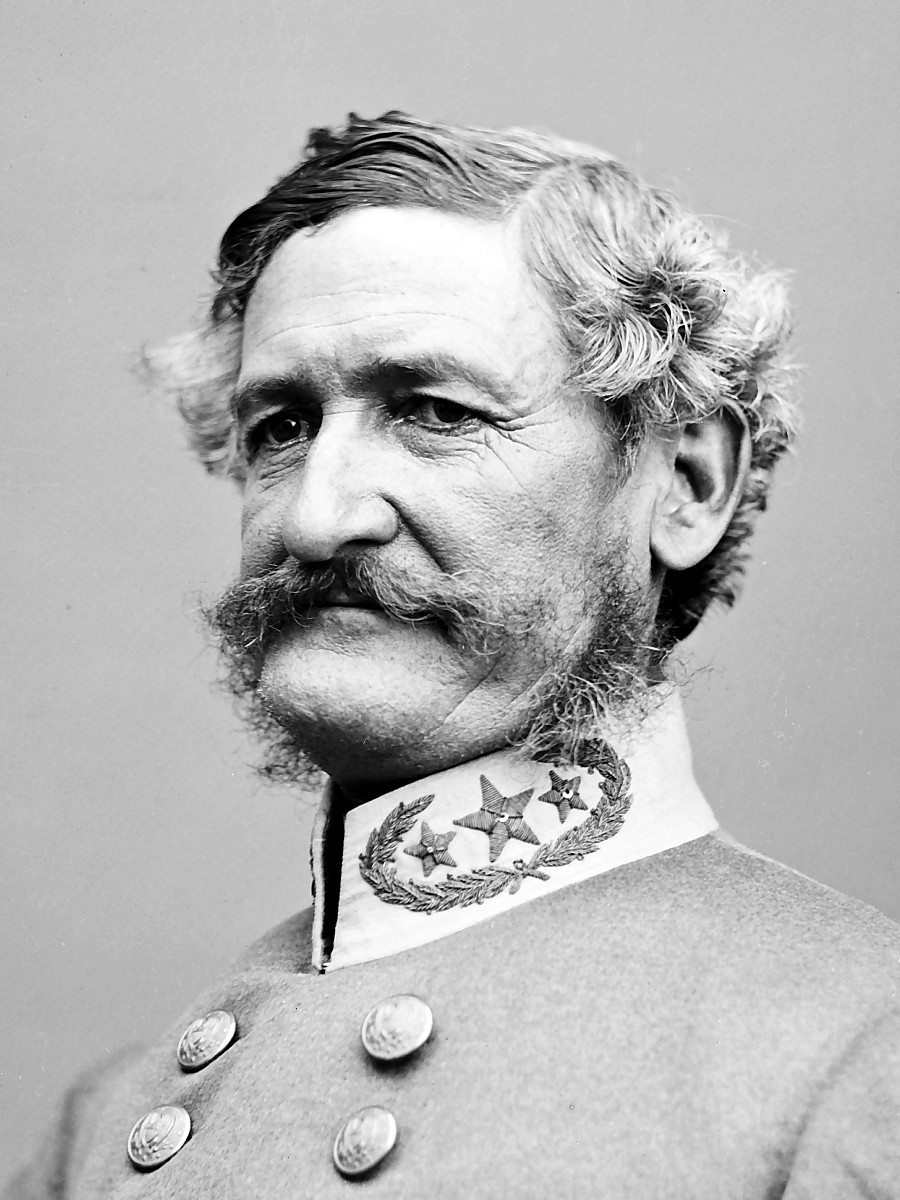
- Sibley, 1861–1865
- Born: May 25, 1816; Natchitoches, Louisiana
- Died: August 23, 1886 (aged 70); Fredericksburg, Virginia
- Military career
- Allegiance: United States; Confederate States; Khedivate of Egypt
- Branch: United States Army; Confederate States Army; Egyptian Army
- Service years: 1838–1861 (USA); 1861–1865 (CSA); 1869–1873 (Egypt)
- Rank: Major (USA); Brigadier General (CSA, Egypt)
- Commands: Army of New Mexico
- Conflicts: Second Seminole War; Mexican–American War; American Civil War; New Mexico Campaign; Battle of Valverde

Henry Hopkins Sibley (May 25, 1816 – August 23, 1886) was a career officer in the United States Army, who commanded a Confederate cavalry brigade in the Civil War.

In 1862, he attempted to forge a supply route from California, in defiance of the Union blockade of the Atlantic and Gulf ports, while also aiming to appropriate the Colorado gold mines to replenish the Confederate treasury. After capturing Albuquerque and Santa Fe, he was forced to retreat after losing the Battle of Glorieta Pass (in today's New Mexico). He was then given minor commands in the southern Louisiana operations, but was accused of serious blunders, apparently caused by drunkenness.

Sibley designed a new easy-to-pack 12-man bell tent and stove that were used for many years by the American and British armies.

== Family and early life ==
Henry Hopkins Sibley's grandfather, John Sibley, served as a medic in Massachusetts in the American Revolutionary War. His wife was Elizabeth Hopkins, whose family name was given as a middle name to their son Samuel and grandson Henry. After her death in 1803, Dr. Sibley was part of an expedition to the Red River country of western Louisiana for the US government after the Louisiana Purchase and chose to settle in Natchitoches. In 1811, his son Samuel Hopkins Sibley and his wife followed to Natchitoches. Samuel Sibley served as a parish clerk from 1815 until his death in 1823.

Henry Hopkins Sibley was born in Natchitoches in 1816. After his father's death when Henry was seven years old, the boy was sent to Missouri to live with his paternal uncle George Champlin Sibley and his wife Mary Easton, the founders of Lindenwood College in St. Charles, Missouri.

Union general and first Governor of Minnesota Henry Hastings Sibley (1811–1891) was a distant cousin. His family had migrated west in the Northern Tier, which historians have called Greater New England.

== U.S. Army service ==
At the age of 17, Henry was admitted to the United States Military Academy at West Point, New York. He graduated in 1838 and was commissioned as second lieutenant in the 2nd U.S. Dragoons.

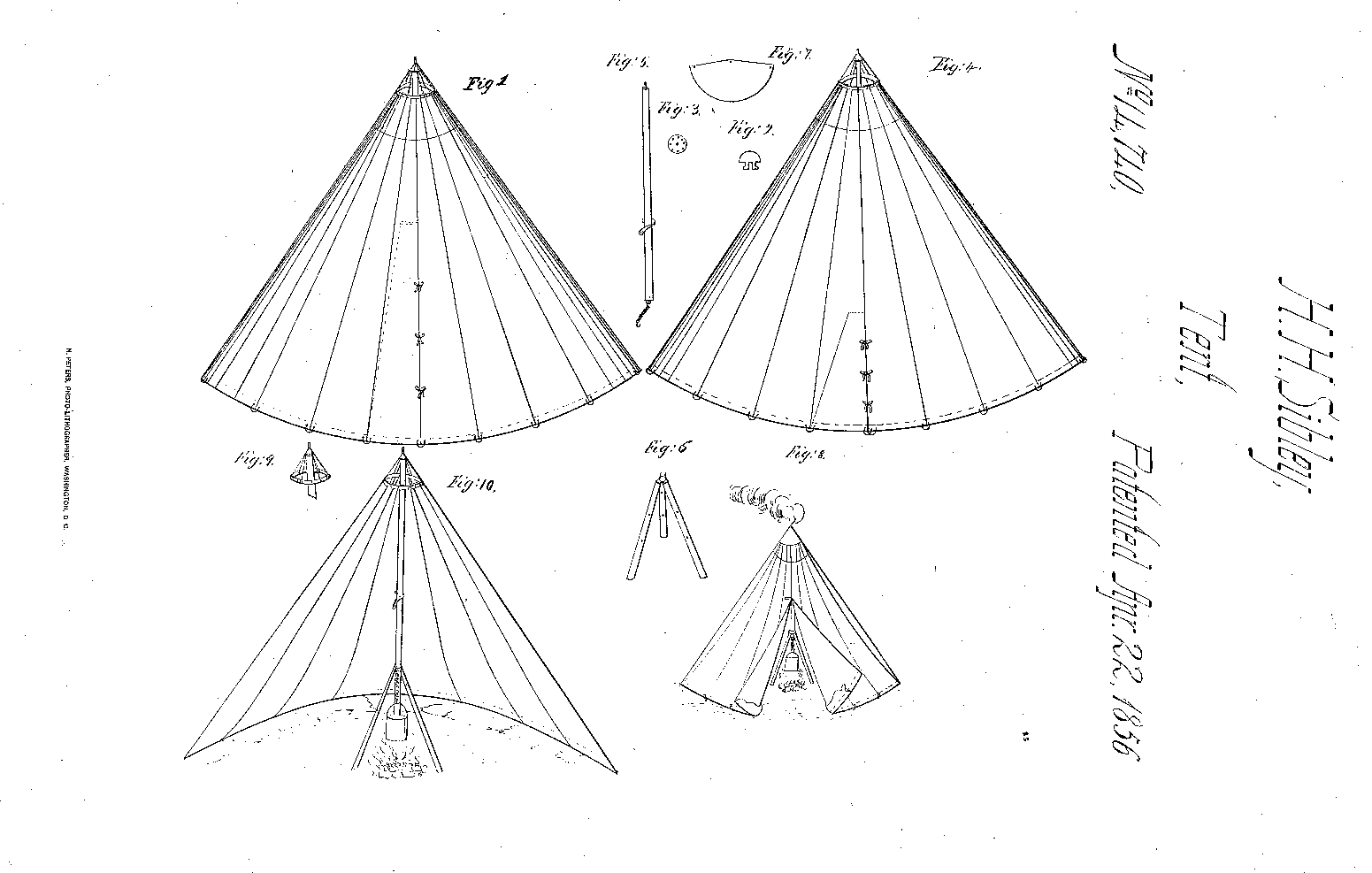
U.S. patent 14,740, showing Sibley's claim for his tent.

He fought Seminole Indians in Florida, 1840–1841; participated in the Military Occupation of Texas, 1845–1846; and fought in the Mexican–American War, 1847–1848. Sibley was on frontier duty in Texas from 1850 to 1855. Sibley was a creative military man. In the 1850s, he invented the "Sibley tent", which was widely used by the Union Army during the American Civil War and for a short while afterward. The United Kingdom also adopted the design of the Sibley tent. He also invented the Sibley stove (also known as the Sibley tent stove), to heat the tent. The Army used tent stoves of this design into the early years of World War II.

From 1855 to 1857, Sibley was part of the forces trying to control conflict in Bleeding Kansas, where hundreds of new settlers arrived to vote on the question of slavery, provoked by the 1854 Kansas–Nebraska Act. He took part in the Utah War, 1857–1860, and was in active service in New Mexico 1860–1861. After the outbreak of the Civil War, Sibley resigned on May 13, 1861, the day of his promotion to major in the 1st Dragoons. Native to Louisiana, he had southern sympathies and joined the Confederate States Army (CSA).

== Civil War ==
Sibley resigned from the US Army as he sided with the Confederacy. Placed in command of a brigade of volunteer cavalry in West Texas, Sibley dubbed his small force the Army of New Mexico and began planning a New Mexico Campaign to capture the cities of Albuquerque and Santa Fe and Fort Union on the Santa Fe Trail to establish a forward base of supply. He then intended to continue north to Colorado to capture the numerous gold and silver mines in the area as a means of replenishing the badly depleted Confederate treasury. From there, Sibley planned to join forces with Confederate Lieut. John R. Baylor, already in control of much of southern New Mexico and Arizona territories and headquartered in Tucson, AZ. Their ultimate strategy was to gain access to the warm-water ports of California and establish a badly needed supply line to the South, as the Union Navy had implemented a naval blockade from Virginia to Texas. Throughout the 1862 New Mexico campaign, his opponent was Colonel Edward Canby, formerly a comrade in arms in the U.S. Army. Some historians have said he was Sibley's brother in law, but this relation has been disputed.

Sibley was initially successful at the Battle of Valverde on 20–21 February, and pressed on to capture Albuquerque and Santa Fe in the first weeks of March. Although the subsequent Battle of Glorieta Pass on March 28 ended in an apparent Confederate victory on the field, Sibley had to retreat because his supply train was destroyed and most of the horses and mules killed or driven off during the fight. At the same time, Union forces were approaching New Mexico from the west, the California Column. Glorieta Pass has been called the "Gettysburg of the West" by some authors; Sibley's retreat to the campaign's starting point at Fort Bliss in April ended the hopes of the Confederacy to stretch to the Pacific Ocean and use the mineral wealth of California and possibly Colorado.

After the failure of the New Mexico campaign, Sibley was given minor commands under General Richard Taylor about Bayou Teche in south Louisiana, commanding the "Arizona Brigade" at the battles of Irish Bend and Fort Bisland. The historian John D. Winters reports that he blundered on several occasions, not striking when instructed. Struggling with alcoholism, he was court martialed in Louisiana in 1863. Although not convicted of cowardice, he was censured.

== Postbellum career and death ==
After the war, Thaddeus P. Mott recruited former Union and CSA soldiers for service in the Egyptian Army. Sibley was one of the first people to arrive in Egypt and served from 1870 to 1873 as a military adviser (with the rank of brigadier general of artillery) to Isma'il Pasha, Khedive of Egypt, overseeing the construction of coastal fortifications. However, he fell back into problems with alcohol, and he was dismissed due to illness and disability.

Back in the U.S., Sibley lived from 1874 with his daughter in Fredericksburg, Virginia. He wrote articles and worked on military inventions. He fought a legal battle with the U.S. government for outstanding payments on his patents.

He died in poverty. He is buried in the Fredericksburg Confederate Cemetery.

== In popular media ==
- Sibley is referred to several times in the film The Good, the Bad and the Ugly (1966) directed by Sergio Leone. He can be seen riding in the passenger seat on a carriage as the soldiers make their procession through a town.
- Sibley is mentioned once in the film A Reason to Live, a Reason to Die by actor Telly Savalas who played a Confederate Major.
- General Sibley appears as a minor character in Nando Cicero's Red Blood, Yellow Gold (1967), played by an uncredited Carlo Gentili.
- He is mentioned in the documentary The Man Who Lost The Civil War (2003), a special feature as part of MGM's release of a Leone DVD anthology in 2003.

== See also ==
- List of American Civil War generals (Confederate)
