= Mesilla =

Mesilla may refer to:

== Places ==
- Mesilla, New Mexico, a town in southern New Mexico, United States
- Mesilla Park, New Mexico, a neighborhood in Las Cruces, New Mexico
- Mesilla Plaza, a plaza in Mesilla, New Mexico
- Mesilla Valley, a valley in New Mexico and Texas
- Mesilla Valley AVA, a wine growing area in New Mexico and Texas
- Mesilla Valley Bosque State Park, a state park in New Mexico
- Mesilla Valley Mall, a mall in Las Cruces, New Mexico
- Mesilla Valley Shale, a geologic formation in New Mexico
- La Mesilla, a village in Guatemala
- La Mesilla, New Mexico, a census-designated place in northern New Mexico

== Other ==
- Mesilla (spider), a spider genus
- Mesilla Diversion Dam, a dam in Texas
- First Battle of Mesilla, an 1861 battle in Mesilla
- Second Battle of Mesilla, an 1862 battle in Mesilla
- Treaty of Mesilla, the Gadsden Purchase agreement between Mexico and United States
- Basilica of San Albino, formerly known as San Albino Church of Mesilla
- Halcones FC, a football club in Huehuetenango, Guatemala, formerly known as Peñarol La Mesilla

== See also ==
- Battle of Mesilla (disambiguation)
