= San Augustin Spring =

Coordinates: 32°25′28″N 106°33′53″W

San Augustin Spring, formerly also known as San Augustine Springs, is a spring in the Organ Mountains in Doña Ana County, New Mexico. It lies on the east side of San Augustin Pass at an elevation of 5627 feet / 1715 meters, 14.7 miles east northeast of Las Cruces, New Mexico.

== History ==
During the early American Civil War this spring was the site of a humiliating surrender of Union Army forces. Following his defeat July 25, 1861, at the First Battle of Mesilla, and under threat by Lt. Col. John R. Baylor's Confederate force at his base at Fort Fillmore on July 26, Federal Major Isaac Lynde decided to abandon the fort and retreat northeast to Fort Stanton through San Augustin Pass in the Organ Mountains. During the pursuit the following day, the Confederates captured hundreds of straggling Federals overcome by the July heat and lack of water. Lynde's dehydrated command, was reduced to 200-300 men by the time it was overtaken by the Confederates. Major Lynde asked for terms and Baylor demanded unconditional surrender, to which Lynde agreed and made his surrender at San Augustine Springs on July 27.
