= Marcus H. MacWillie =

Scottish-American lawyer and Confederate Arizona politician

Marcus MacWillie

Member of the C.S. House of Representatives from Arizona's at-large district
- In office February 18, 1862 – May 10, 1865
- Preceded by: Constituency established
- Succeeded by: Constituency abolished

Personal details
- Party: Democratic

Marcus H. MacWillie was a politician who represented the Confederate Arizona Territory in the Congress of the Confederate States during the American Civil War.

M. H. MacWillie was born circa 1836 in Inverness, Scotland. Little is known of his early life. One newspaper account claimed he was a relative of Mississippi Governor William McWillie (1795–1869), but this seems unlikely. MacWillie passed his bar exam and established a legal practice in Texas. He later moved to Mesilla in what is now New Mexico and resumed his legal career. In early 1861 served as district judge, then chief justice, in Dr. Lewis S. Owings' short-lived provisional government of the Arizona Territory (which included modern day New Mexico and Arizona).

Following the outbreak of the Civil War, Confederate army colonel John R. Baylor successfully invaded southern New Mexico and became the new Territorial governor. MacWillie became the Attorney General of the Confederate-claimed Arizona Territory in the newly designated capital of La Mesilla. Through the shrewd political efforts of his powerful friend John R. Baylor, MacWillie was selected December 30, 1861 to replace Baylor's rival Granville Henderson Oury as the territory's representative to the permanent Congress. Despite Arizona and New Mexico being taken over by the Union Army later in 1862, MacWillie continued to represent the territory throughout the First Confederate Congress (March 11, 1862 – February 17, 1864). He then served in the Second Confederate Congress until the end of the war.

MacWillie's activities following the war are uncertain. What we do know is that he lived in Chihuahua, Mexico, as an attorney, often handling mining claims. He was also involved in various southern Texas–northern Mexico railroad promotions, often visiting Texas, New Mexico, New Orleans and New York City. He died in Santa Barbara, California, March 5, 1875, during a trip to line up investors for a silver mine.

== Notes ==
Confederate States House of Representatives
New constituency	Delegate to the C.S. House of Representatives from Arizona's at-large congressional district 1862–1865	Constituency abolished
