= Battle of Mesilla =

Battle of Mesilla may refer to the following minor battles of the American Civil War that occurred in modern-day Mesilla, New Mexico:

- First Battle of Mesilla
- Second Battle of Mesilla
