= Confederate Arizona =

Territory of the Confederate States of America

Arizona Territory
- Organized incorporated territory of the Confederate States
- 1861–1865
- Flag of the Confederate; States (August 1, 1861)

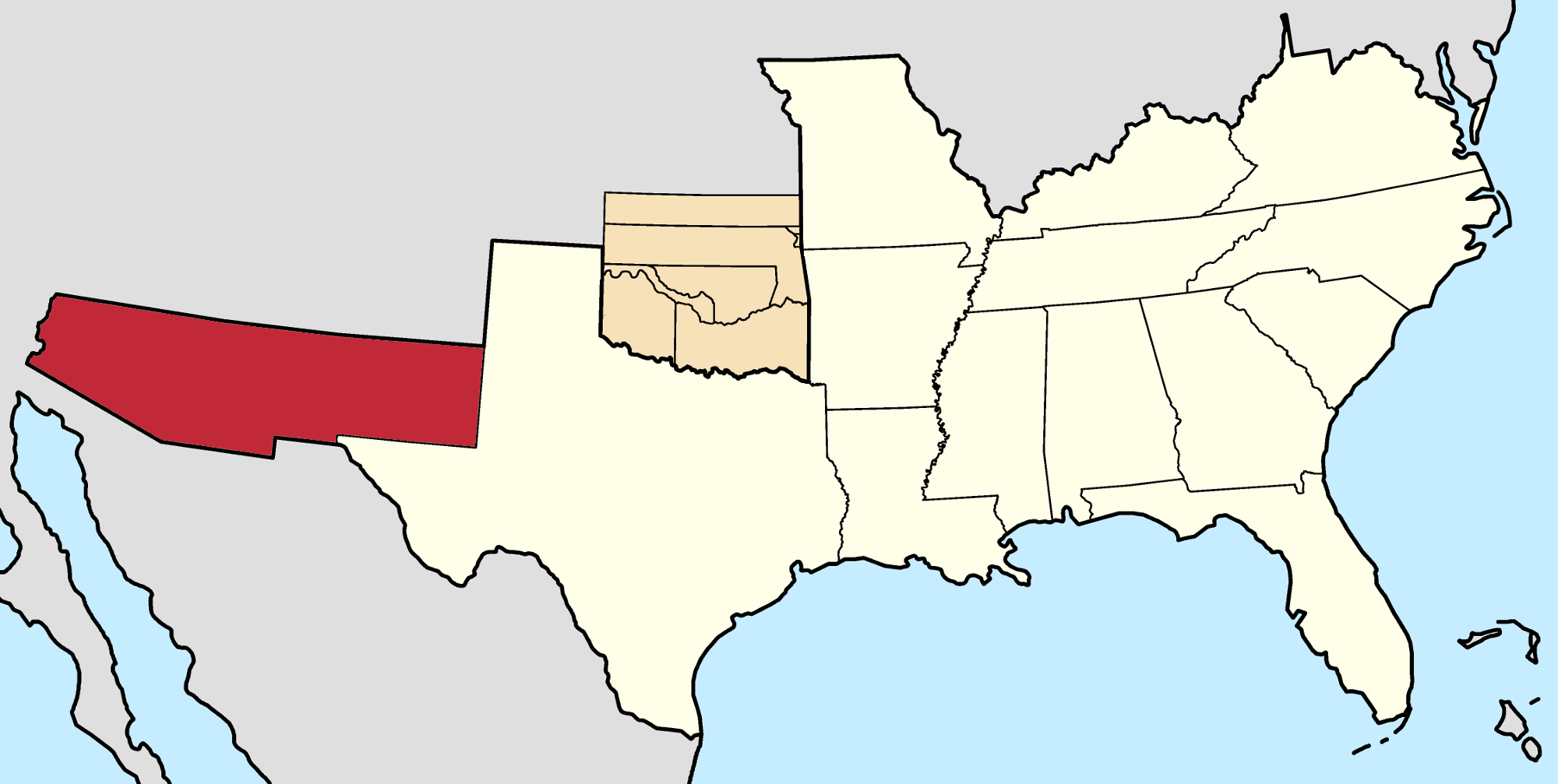
- Map of the Confederate States with Arizona Territory highlighted
- Capital: Mesilla (1861–1862); San Antonio (in exile; 1862–1865)
- Area
  - Coordinates: 32°16′N 106°42′W
- Government
  - Type: Organized incorporated territory
- Governor
  - 1861–1862: Col. John R. Baylor
  - 1862–1865: Dr. Lewis S. Owings (in exile)
- Legislature: Arizona Territorial Legislature
- Historical era: American Civil War
  - Ordinance of Secession: March 28, 1861
  - Col. Baylor's Proclamation (Note: The Confederate Territory of Arizona was proclaimed in Mesilla on August 1, 1861.): August 1, 1861
  - Organized by Confederacy: January 18, 1862
  - Occupied by U.S.: July 8, 1862
  - Surrender of C.S. Trans-Mississippi Department: May 26, 1865
Preceded by	Succeeded by
New Mexico Territory	Arizona Territory; New Mexico Territory
- Today part of: United States: Arizona; New Mexico

The Arizona Territory, colloquially referred to as Confederate Arizona, was an organized incorporated territory of the Confederate States of America that existed from August 1, 1861, to May 26, 1865, when the Confederate States Army Trans-Mississippi Department, commanded by General Edmund Kirby Smith, surrendered at Shreveport, Louisiana. However, after the Battle of Glorieta Pass, the Confederates had to retreat from the territory, and by July 1862, effective Confederate control of the territory had ended. Delegates to the secession convention had voted in March 1861 to secede from the New Mexico Territory and the Union, and seek to join the Confederacy. It consisted of the portion of the New Mexico Territory south of the 34th parallel, including parts of the modern states of New Mexico and Arizona. The capital was Mesilla, along the southern border. The breakaway region overlapped Arizona Territory, established by the Union government in February 1863.

Arizona was proclaimed a Confederate territory on August 1, 1861, after Colonel John R. Baylor's victory at the Battle of Mesilla. His hold on the area was broken after Glorieta Pass (March 26–28, 1862), the defining battle of the New Mexico Campaign. In July 1862, the Confederate territorial government withdrew to El Paso, Texas. With the approach of Union troops, it relocated to San Antonio, where it remained for the duration of the civil war. The territory continued to be represented in the Confederate States Congress, and Confederate troops continued to fight under the Arizona banner until the war ended.

The political geography of the two Arizona Territories differed in that the Confederate Arizona was approximately the southern half of the historic New Mexico Territory, while the Union-defined Arizona Territory was approximately the western half of what had been New Mexico Territory, which became the basis for present-day Arizona.

== Background ==
Before the start of the war, the land of the current states of New Mexico and Arizona was part of the New Mexico Territory and the Gadsden Purchase, which ran parallel to William Walker's Republics of Lower California and Sonora. As early as 1856, the territorial government in Santa Fe had raised concerns about being able to effectively govern the southern part of the territory. It was separated from the rest by the Jornada del Muerto, a difficult stretch of desert.

In February 1858, the New Mexico territorial legislature adopted a resolution in favor of the creation of the Arizona Territory. The border was to be defined along the 32nd meridian west from Washington. The legislature proposed that all the Indians of New Mexico would be removed to northern Arizona.

In April 1860, impatient for Congress to act, the territory called a convention and 31 delegates met in Tucson. In July 1860, the convention drafted a constitution for a "Territory of Arizona" to be organized out of the New Mexico Territory south of 34th parallel north. The convention elected Lewis S. Owings as the Territorial Governor, and elected a delegate to Congress.

Anti-slavery Representatives opposed creating a new territory, as they feared it had the potential to become a slave state. Many people in the area were pro-slavery, with business connections in southern states, from which some had migrated. In addition, all of this new territory lay below the old Missouri Compromise line of demarcation between slave and free states.

Since the proceedings of the Tucson convention were never ratified by the United States Congress, the Provisional Territory was not considered a legal entity. For a time it operated as a de facto, if not de jure, government for the intended Arizona Territory. Lewis S. Owings, Governor of the Provisional Territory, appointed James Henry Tevis to raise the first Territorial Militia. This comprised three companies of Arizona Rangers for the protection of the Territory from marauding Apaches and bandits. Two companies were raised in the Pinos Altos mining camp, and another at Mesilla.

== Secession ==
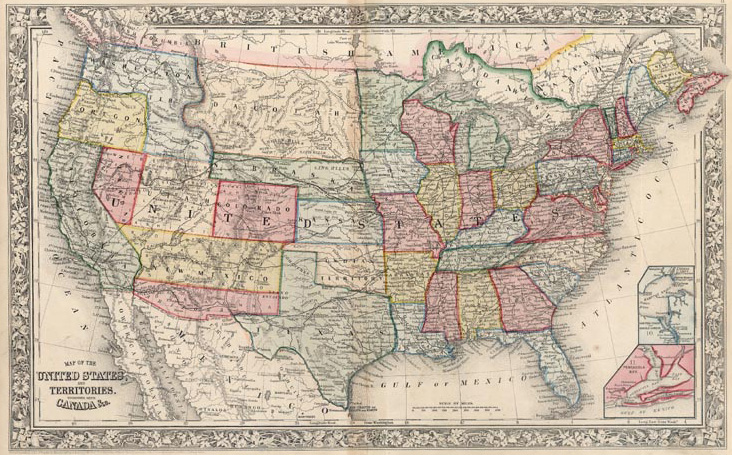
1861 map showing the Confederate Arizona Territory

After the start of the American Civil War, support for the Confederacy was strong in the southern part of the New Mexico Territory. Some residents felt neglected by the United States government. They worried about the lack of sufficient troops to fight the Apache. These Native Americans were attacking White settlers, killing off ranchers and mining camps all over Traditional Arizona. This became open warfare following the February 3–9, 1861 Bascom Affair, that brought Cochise into the war. Arizona settlers were also disturbed by the closing of the Butterfield Overland Mail route and their stations in March 1861, which had connected the Arizona frontier colonies to the East and California.

In March 1861, the citizens of Mesilla called a secession convention to join the Confederacy. On March 16 the convention adopted a secession ordinance, citing the region's common interests and geography with the Confederacy, their political sympathy with the Southern secession movement, their opposition to the "sectional" party, the "Black" Republicans, the need of frontier protection, and the loss of postal service routes under the United States government, as reasons for their separation. The ordinance proposed the question of secession to the western portions of the territory. On March 28 a second convention in present-day Tucson met and ratified the ordinance. The conventions subsequently established a provisional territorial government for the Confederate "Territory of Arizona." Owings was elected again as provisional governor and Granville Henderson Oury was chosen as a delegate to petition for the territory's admission into the Confederacy.

== Confederate units ==
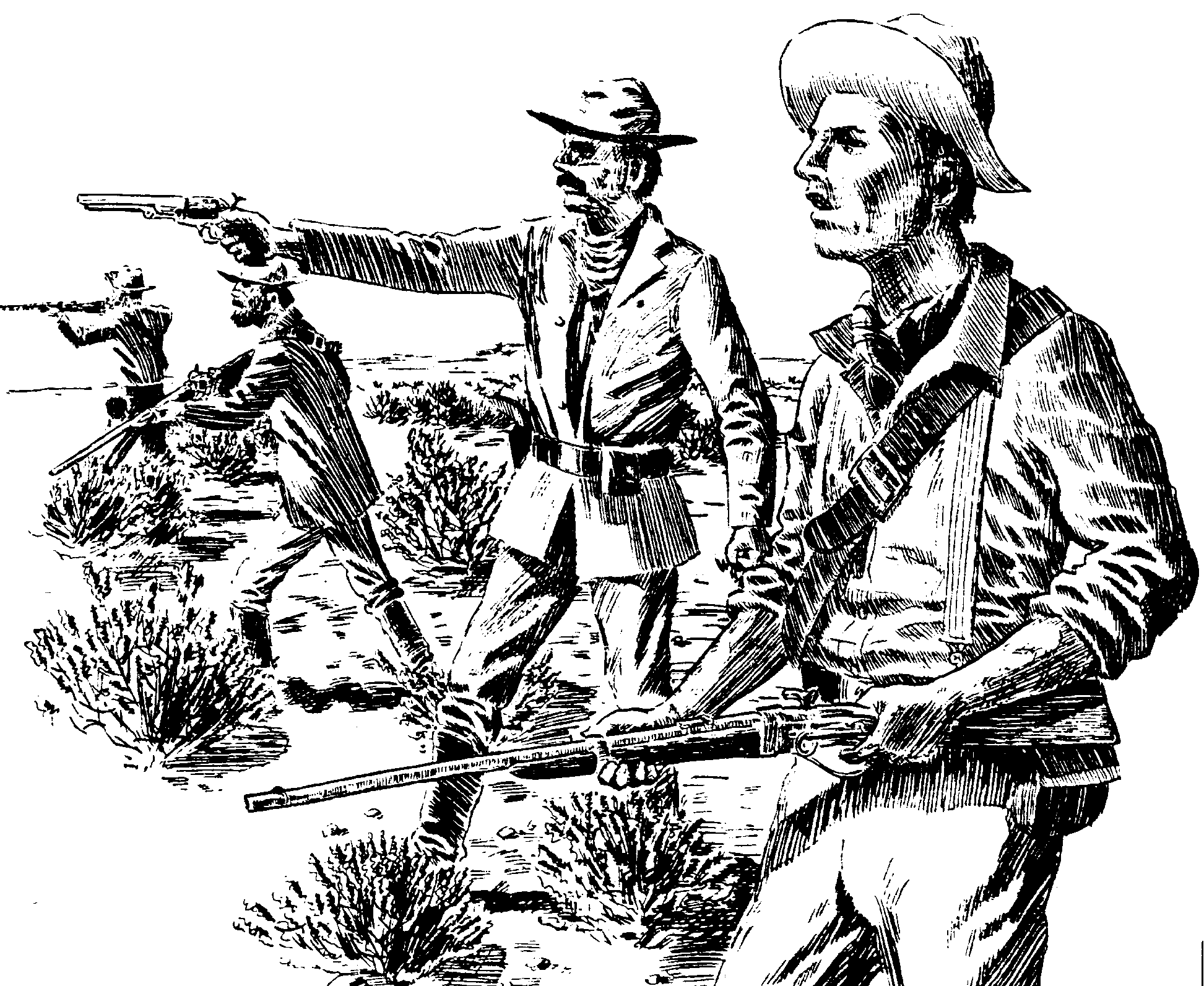
Arizona Guards

- Arizona Militia (1860–1862)
  - Arizona Guards (Pinos Altos mining camp)
  - Arizona Rangers (Mesilla)
  - Minute Men (Pinos Altos mining camp)
- Herbert's Battalion, Arizona Cavalry (1862–1863)
  - Capt. Thomas Helm's Company (Arizona Guards)
  - Capt. G. H. Oury's Company (Arizona Rangers)
  - Capt. R. L. Swope's Company (Arizona Rangers)

== Major campaigns ==
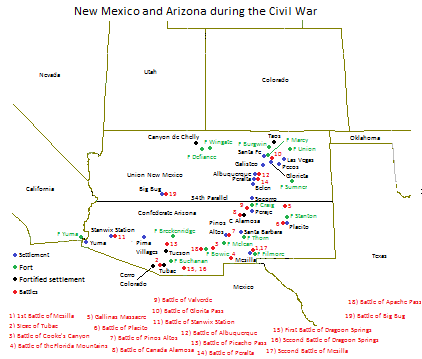

Arizona was thought to be important to the role of the New Mexico Territory in the American Civil War primarily because it offered Confederate access to California. Consequently, it was the scene of several important battles in the war's Trans-Mississippi Theater.

In July 1861 a force under Lieutenant-Colonel John R. Baylor arrived in El Paso, Texas across the border from Mesilla. With support from the secessionist residents of Mesilla, Baylor's 2nd Texas Mounted Rifles entered the territory and took a position in the town on July 25. Union forces under Major Isaac Lynde at nearby Fort Fillmore prepared to attack Baylor. On July 25 the two armies met outside of town at the Battle of Mesilla in a brief engagement in which the Union troops were defeated.

Major Lynde then abandoned Fort Fillmore and began a march north to join the troops at Fort Craig under Colonel Edward R. S. Canby. However, his retreat came to a halt in severe heat and was overtaken by Baylor. Lynde surrendered his command without a shot fired at San Augustine Springs, in the Organ Mountains.

On August 1, 1861, the victorious Baylor proclaimed the existence of a Confederate Arizona Territory, which comprised the area defined in the Tucson convention the previous year. He appointed himself as permanent governor. Among his cabinet members was the Mesilla attorney Marcus H. MacWillie, who served as the territorial attorney general.

The next month, Baylor's cavalrymen under Bethel Coopwood, marched north from Camp Robledo along the Rio Grande and surprised a Union force of New Mexican militia cavalry in a small engagement west of the Rio Grande at the village of Canada Alamosa, ending with another Confederate victory and the capture of 25 men of that unit including its commander. The next day after disarming and paroling the captured New Mexican enlisted men, Coopwood retired southward along the west bank of the river with the two captured Union officers and an NCO to a camp 15 miles to the north of Fort Thorn. There a Union column of Mounted Infantry sent to relieve the New Mexican militia force caught up with Coopwood, and skirmished for a few hours with the Confederates until their ammunition was depleted, forcing the Mounted Infantry to retire northward to their base at Fort Craig.

The proposal to organize the Confederate Territory of Arizona was passed by the Confederate Congress in early 1862 and proclaimed by President Jefferson Davis on February 14, 1862. Coincidentally, Arizona statehood was approved exactly fifty years later on February 14, 1912.

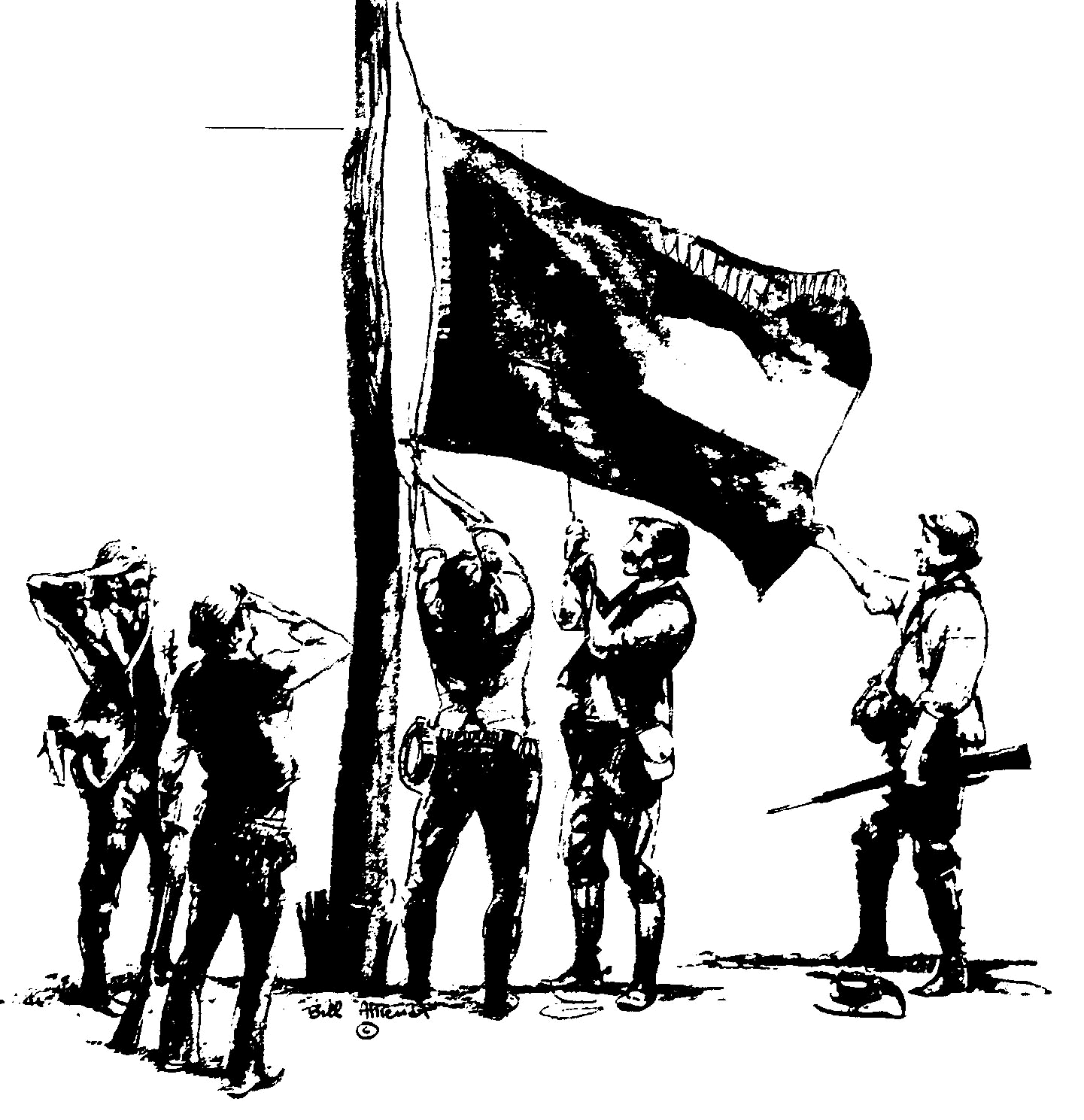
Raising the Confederate flag in Tucson.

Efforts by the Confederacy to secure control of the region led to the New Mexico Campaign. Baylor sent Company A, Arizona Rangers to Tucson to protect the population from the Apache and delay the advance of Union troops from Fort Yuma.

In 1862 Baylor was ousted as governor of the territory by President Davis, and the Confederate loss at the Battle of Glorieta Pass forced Confederate retreat from the territory. On March 30, Union forces fought a smaller engagement against a detachment of Company A, Arizona Rangers, a Confederate force destroying supply depots along the California Column route of advance on the Gila River, 80 miles east of its base at Fort Yuma. This skirmish, known as the Battle of Stanwix Station, was the westernmost engagement of regular forces in the Civil War, and successfully delayed the advance of the California forces.

The following month a small picket troop of the Rangers north of Tucson fought with an equally small Union cavalry patrol from the California Column in the so-called Battle of Picacho Pass again delaying the advance of the California Column to Tucson.

By July 1862, Union forces of the California Column were approaching the territorial capital of Mesilla from the west but severe flooding of the Rio Grande barred their way and they had to divert north to Fort Thorn and the San Diego Crossing and wait two weeks for the water to fall enough for a crossing. With Canby advancing down the east bank of the Rio Grande and the loss of control of the countryside to New Mexican guerillas after the Second Battle of Mesilla the Confederates abandoned Mesilla and retreated south to Franklin, Texas.

In 1862 the California Column volunteers who fought at Stanwix Station and Picacho Pass fought at the Battle of Apache Pass against 500 Apaches. The battle is considered part of the American Civil War. There were also several engagements between Apaches and Confederates. The Battle of Dragoon Springs marks the only known Confederate combat deaths in the modern confines of Arizona. Other engagements include the Siege of Tubac, the Battle of Cookes Canyon, the Battle of the Florida Mountains, the Battle of Pinos Altos and a number of other smaller skirmishes and massacres.

The territorial government relocated to Franklin, then with Confederate military units retreated to San Antonio abandoning West Texas. For the rest of the war, California Column troops controlled all of Confederate Arizona, Franklin and Fort Quitman in West Texas. The government in exile remained in Texas for the duration of the war, although MacWillie continued to represent the territory in the First and 2nd Confederate States Congresses. Minor resistance in Arizona continued at the partisan level, and Confederate units under the banner of Arizona fought until the end of the war in May 1865.

== See also ==
- List of governors of dependent territories in the 19th century
- New Mexico Territory in the American Civil War
