= Helena, Texas =

Human settlement in Texas, United States of America

Coordinates: 28°57′14″N 97°49′24″W

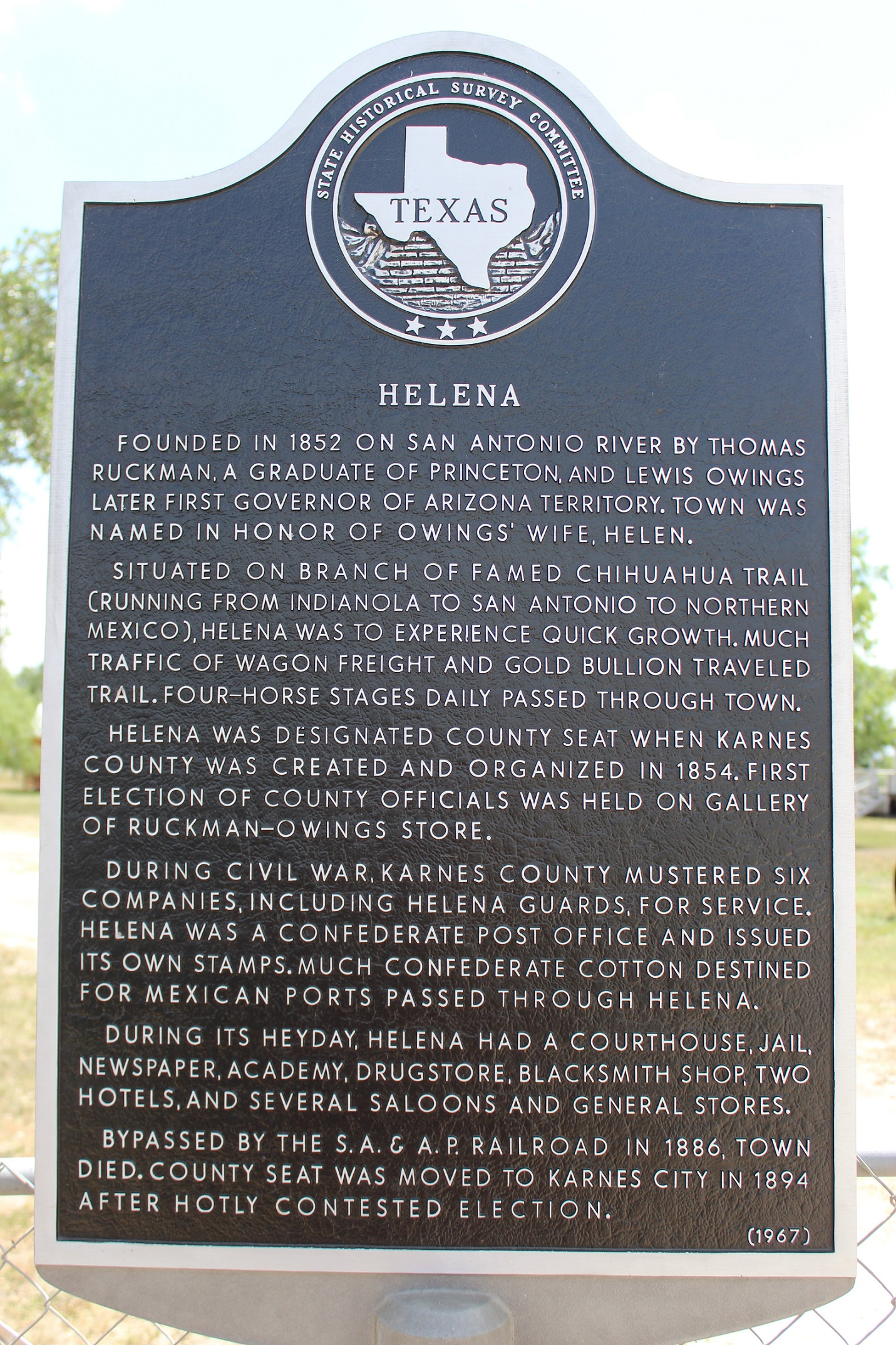
Helena historical marker

Helena is a ghost town in Texas, approximately 70 mi (110 km) southeast of San Antonio in Karnes County. The seat of Karnes County from 1854 to 1894, Helena was once known as the self-proclaimed "toughest town on earth" in the mid-19th century. It was named for the second wife of Dr. Lewis S. Owings, Helen M. Owings née Swisher.

The town was the birthplace of the so-called "Helena Duel", in which the left hands of two opponents are tied together with buckskin and each fighter is given a knife with a three-inch blade – too short to reach a vital organ or cause a single fatal stab. After the combatants are whirled around a few times, they slash away at each other until one bleeds to death from the accumulation of cuts and stabs. Crowds of spectators would view this gory, gruesome spectacle and place bets on the outcome.

Helena is a ghost town allegedly because of the vendetta that Colonel William G. Butler (1831–1912), a powerful rancher, had against the town he blamed for the death of his son, Emmett Butler, who had been killed by a stray bullet from a saloon brawl on December 26, 1884. A few days later, Colonel Butler went to Helena with group of cowhands and demanded to know who had shot his son and found that none of the townspeople was willing to tell the truth. Enraged, Colonel Butler reportedly shouted: "All right! For that I'll kill the town that killed my son!" Following through on his threat, Butler, a veteran of the American Civil War, arranged for the tracks of the San Antonio and Aransas Pass Railway to be built 7 mi (11 km) away from Helena. Then, in a bitterly contested election in 1894 the county seat was moved from Helena to Karnes City. Helena quickly died.
