= Lewis S. Owings =

American politician (1820–1875)

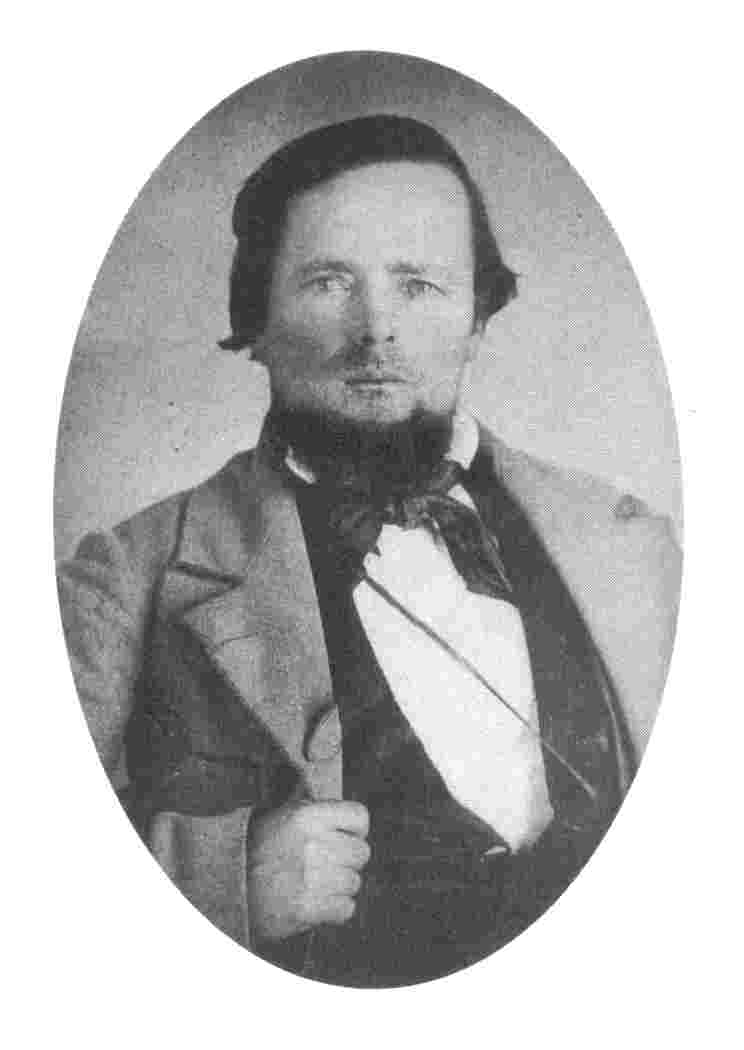

Governor of Arizona Territory
- Provisional
- In office April 2, 1860 – August 1, 1861
- Lieutenant: Ignacio Orrantia
- Preceded by: New office
- Succeeded by: Lieut. Col. John R. Baylor as Territorial Governor

2nd Governor of Arizona Territory (Confederate)
- In exile
- In office March 17, 1862 – May 26, 1865
- Preceded by: Lieut. Col. John R. Baylor
- Succeeded by: Office abolished

Personal details
- Born: Lewis Sumpter Owings; September 6, 1820 Roane County, Tennessee, U.S.
- Died: August 20, 1875 (aged 54) Denison, Texas, U.S.
- Resting place: Oakwood Cemetery, Denison, Texas, U.S. 33°45′40.8″N 96°31′44.8″W
- Party: Democratic
- Spouse: Helen M. Swisher (m. 1852)
- Occupation: Politician, businessman
- Profession: Physician

Dr. Lewis S. Owings (September 6, 1820 – August 20, 1875) was an American politician, medical doctor, and businessman from Tennessee who served as the 2nd Governor of Arizona Territory (Confederate), in exile, from 1862 to 1865. He had previously served as provisional governor of Arizona Territory from 1860 to 1861.

== Early life ==
Born in Roane County, Tennessee, Owings went to Yell County, Arkansas and then to Texas, where he helped found the town of Helena, serving as the first postmaster. In 1855, he served in the Texas House of Representatives but was defeated for reelection moving to Mesilla, New Mexico, where he had a mine.

== Political career ==
In 1860 Owings was chosen as Provisional Governor of "Arizona Territory"—a region including New Mexico and Arizona—in an organization convention at Tucson. The Convention subsequently petitioned the United States Congress for recognition of their government, but the impending conflicts of the American Civil War in the east distracted Washington's attention away from what was then a remote frontier outpost. Owings nevertheless proceeded to carry out the official functions of a de facto governor in the largely unorganized territory and established three militia companies to protect residents from native raids and border smugglers.

Owings held the post until August 1, 1861, when the Arizona Territory was formally reorganized by the Confederacy and declared south of the 34th Parallel by Lieutenant Colonel John R. Baylor, who then assumed the governorship. In 1862, following Baylor's ouster and the Confederate retreat from the territory following the Union victory at Glorieta Pass, Owings was again appointed Governor of the territory and held the office in exile in San Antonio until the end of the Civil War.

== Later life ==
After the American Civil War, Owings went to Kansas briefly and then settled in Denison, Texas, serving briefly as mayor.

Government offices
New office	Governor of Arizona Territory; Provisional; 1860–1861	Succeeded by Lieutenant Colonel John R. Baylor as Territorial Governor (Confederate)
Preceded by Lieutenant Colonel John R. Baylor	Governor of Arizona Territory (Confederate); In exile 1862–1865	Office abolished
