= Fort Fillmore =

- U.S. National Register of Historic Places
- NM State Register of Cultural Properties
- Location within New Mexico
- Nearest city: Las Cruces, New Mexico
- Coordinates: 32°13′30″N 106°42′52″W
- Area: 24.4 acres (9.9 ha)
- Built: 1851
- NRHP reference No.: 74001196
- NMSRCP No.: 36

Significant dates
- Added to NRHP: July 30, 1974
- Designated NMSRCP: February 21, 1969

Fort Fillmore, located at 32°13′30″N 106°42′52″W, was a United States military fortification established by Colonel Edwin Vose Sumner in September 1851 near Mesilla in what is now New Mexico, primarily for the purpose of protecting settlers and traders traveling to California. Early frontier migrants were under constant threat from attack by local Native Americans, and a network of forts was eventually created by the U.S. government to protect and encourage westward expansion. Fort Fillmore was intended to protect a corridor plagued by hostile Apaches, where several migration routes converged between El Paso and Tucson to take advantage of Apache Pass.

== Construction ==
Fort Fillmore was originally constructed in the jacal style with upright wood posts plastered over with adobe; later, more substantial adobe walls were erected. Much of the work on the fort was done by the soldiers with the assistance of local Mexican laborers who made the adobe bricks.

The post was built on sand hills above the Rio Grande. The Rio Grande would later change its course, making the fort about 1 mile from the river. This forced the army to use water wagons to supply the post with water and made it hard to defend in the event of attack.

Fort Fillmore served as an operating base for units of the 1st Dragoons, briefly the 2nd Dragoons, Regiment of Mounted Rifles, and the 3rd and briefly the 8th Infantry Regiments. It was for a time the headquarters of the 3rd Infantry Regiment. The troops were active in the Gila Expedition of 1857 and in operations against the Apaches in the Sacramento Mountains. In one foray, Captain Henry W. Stanton, namesake of Fort Stanton, New Mexico, was killed near the Rio Penasco. His grave was one of the few to be identified when the abandoned post was inspected in 1869. Most of the soldiers and civilians interred in the fort's cemetery are still buried there on a sand ridge southeast of the remains of the fort. A fence and flagpole are now located on the cemetery's site.

Fort Fillmore was a stop on the Butterfield Overland Mail.

Possibly the most famous soldier who served at Fort Fillmore was Captain George Pickett. Pickett is best remembered for leading the fateful charge on July 3, 1863 at the Battle of Gettysburg. In 1855, Union General Ambrose Burnside used the fort as a supply point when he drilled geothermal wells about fifteen miles west of the post..

== Abandonment ==
Two days after the Union's unsuccessful attack on Confederate soldiers under the command of Lt. Col. John Baylor at the First Battle of Mesilla on July 25, 1861, Fort Fillmore was set afire and abandoned by the Union army. As they retreated back to Fort Stanton under Major Isaac Lynde, they became desperately thirsty and exhausted. When 300 Confederate soldiers approached the 500 retreating Union soldiers, Lynde surrendered his demoralized troops without firing a shot.

On August 7, 1862, federal troops near Fort Fillmore engaged in a skirmish with Confederate troops retreating from Santa Fe, defeating them.

The fort was officially closed by the Union in October 1862, but sources continue to mention Fort Fillmore as a waypoint along several major routes throughout the period of westward expansion. The Upper and Lower Emigrant Trails converged in El Paso and, along with the Butterfield, Pacific and Overland Trails, passed through the corridor Fort Fillmore was erected to defend. The remains of the fort were leveled at some later date after a failed attempt by the owner to sell or trade it to the State of New Mexico as a park. A grove of pecan trees now stands on the approximate location of the fort.

== See also ==
- National Register of Historic Places listings in Doña Ana County, New Mexico
