= The White Man =

Weekly newspaper in Texas, US

- Founder(s): Harris A. Hamner, John R. Baylor, and Isaac Worrall
- Founded: 1860 or earlier
- Ceased publication: 1861
- City: Jacksboro, Texas

The White Man was a weekly newspaper that primarily shared information regarding the removal of Native Americans from North Texas. The first publications were printed in the 1860s in Jacksboro, Jack County. The original editors included H. A. Hamner, John R. Baylor, and Isaac Worrall.

The newspaper ceased publication in 1861, when Hamner and Baylor joined the Confederate Army.
