= Mesilla Plaza =

- La Mesilla Historic District
- U.S. National Register of Historic Places
- U.S. National Historic Landmark District
- NM State Register of Cultural Properties
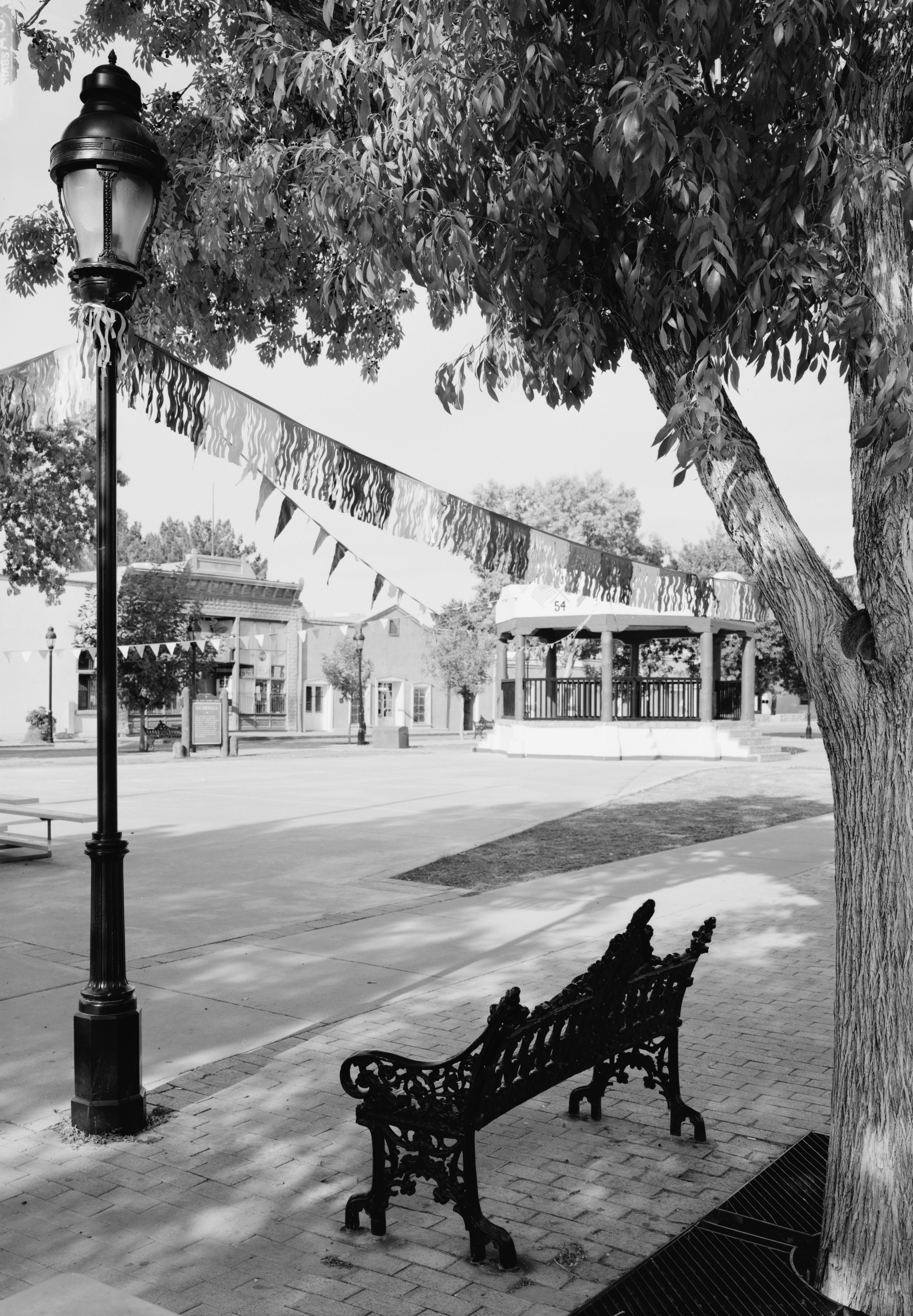
- Mesilla Plaza, looking northwest, 2005

- Location within New Mexico Location within the United States
- Location: Roughly bounded by Calle del Norte, Calle del El Paso, Calle del Cura and Calleion Guerro, Mesilla, New Mexico
- Coordinates: 32°16′27.519″N 106°47′43.6632″W
- Built: 1848
- Architectural style: Mission/Spanish Revival
- NRHP reference No.: 66000475 (original); 82003323 (increase)
- NMSRCP No.: 14, 776

Significant dates
- Added to NRHP: October 15, 1966
- Boundary increase: July 20, 1982
- Designated NHLD: July 4, 1961
- Designated NMSRCP: August 29, 1980

Mesilla Plaza is the central plaza in the small town of Mesilla in far southern New Mexico. The plaza and a number of its surrounding buildings are a National Historic Landmark District, significant for its role in the transfers of power that brought first the original New Mexico Territory and later the Gadsden Purchase into United States control. The most notable building facing the plaza is the Basilica of San Albino, which has been on the plaza since its establishment in 1851. The plaza was declared a National Historic Landmark in 1961.

== Description and History ==
The town of Mesilla was created by a Mexican government decree in 1848, as a place to receive Mexican citizens who sought to remain on Mexican soil after the cession of the northern parts of present-day New Mexico were ceded to the United States in the 1848 Treaty of Guadalupe Hidalgo, which ended the Mexican–American War. Just five years later, the Gadsden Purchase agreement result in the United States purchase of the southern strips of present-day New Mexico and Arizona, an area that includes Mesilla. The Mesilla Plaza was the site of an official flag-raising ceremony on November 18, 1854, confirming United States sovereignty over the area. The town continued to hold a prominent economic role in territorial affairs, serving as a stop on the Butterfield Overland Mail route, and other stagecoach routes. It served as a military center during the American Civil War, at different times for both Union and Confederate forces in the Arizona Territory.

Mesilla Plaza was the site of one of the bloodiest political riots in New Mexico history. On August 27, 1871, Democrats held a large political rally in the plaza for their candidate for territorial delegate to the United States Congress. Republicans were also holding a rally at a nearby home for their candidate. The Republicans moved from the house to the plaza to disrupt the Democrats' rally. The two groups confronted each other yelling and shoving. One man was struck with an axe handle and then shooting started. Soldiers from nearby Fort Selden stationed in the town to stop any violence had left earlier when it appeared the rallies were peaceful. A messenger caught up with the soldiers and they returned to Mesilla. By then, most of the violence was over. Nine people were killed, and an estimated fifty people were injured.

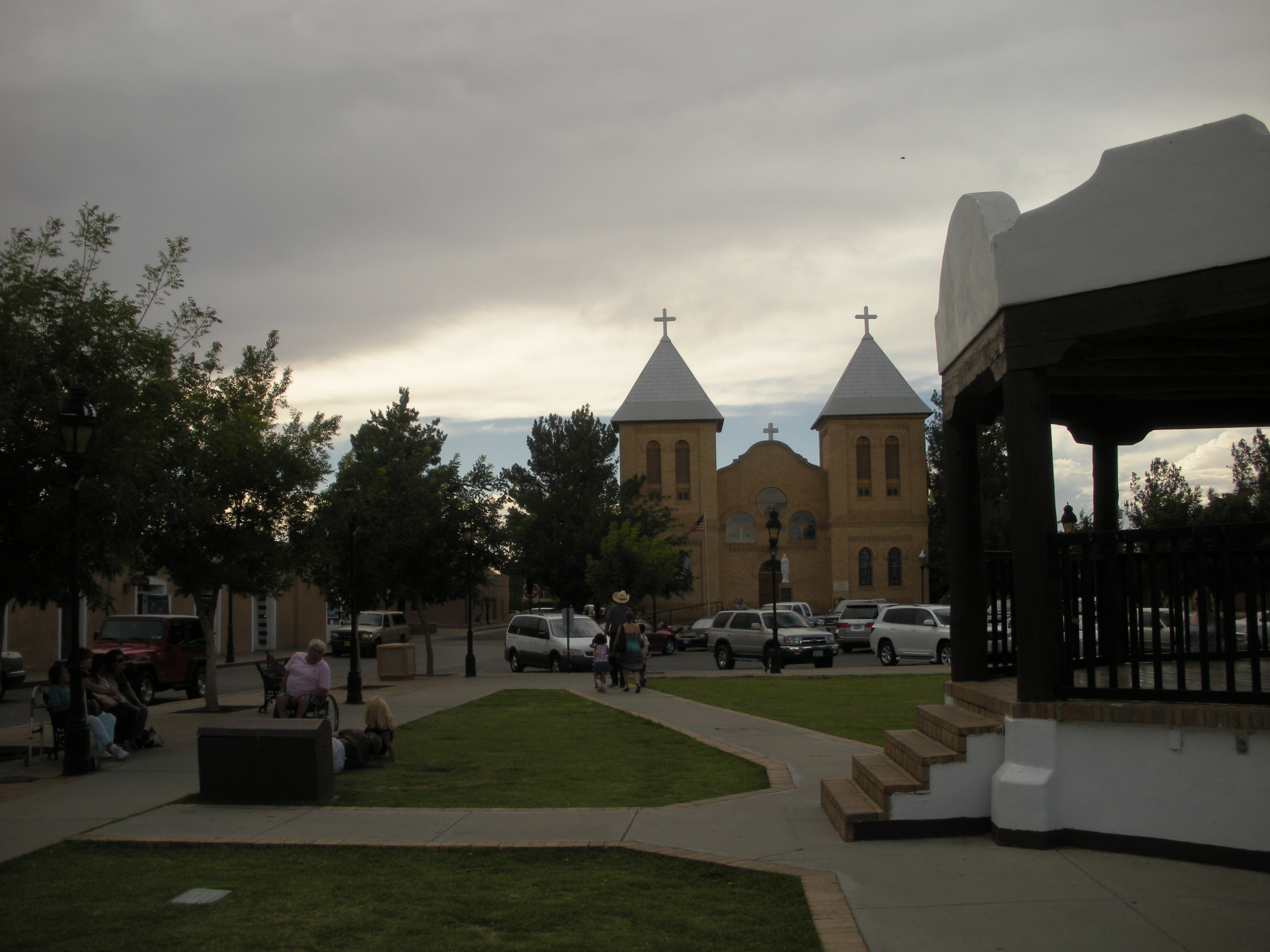
View of the plaza in 2009

The plaza today is still ringed by many buildings harkening back to its early days. The plaza itself, originally an open dirt area, is now lined by brick sidewalks and is grassy, and sports a bandstand built in the 1970s. The most prominent structure is the Basilica of San Albino, built in 1906 on the site of the original 1852 church. Buildings on the east and west sides include Territorial style buildings from the 1850s, among them the original Butterfield State ticket office and waiting room. Some buildings were originally built as residences, but have since been readapted for commercial use, while some were originally built for commercial use.

== See also ==
- National Register of Historic Places listings in Doña Ana County, New Mexico
- List of National Historic Landmarks in New Mexico
