= Tuberculosis hut =

Small treatment facility for tuberculosis patients

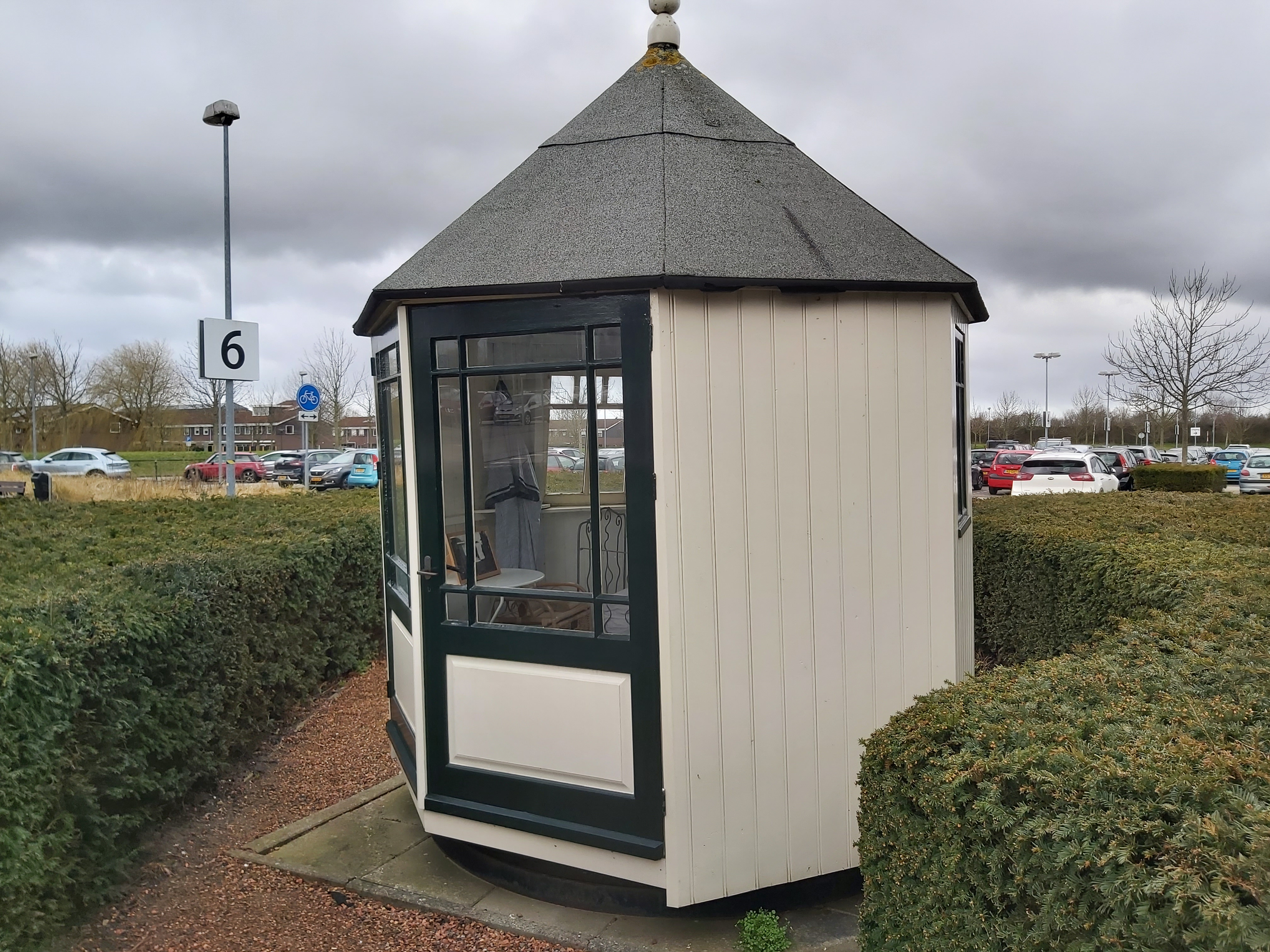
Tuberculosis hut near the Spaarne Gasthuis hospital in Hoofddorp

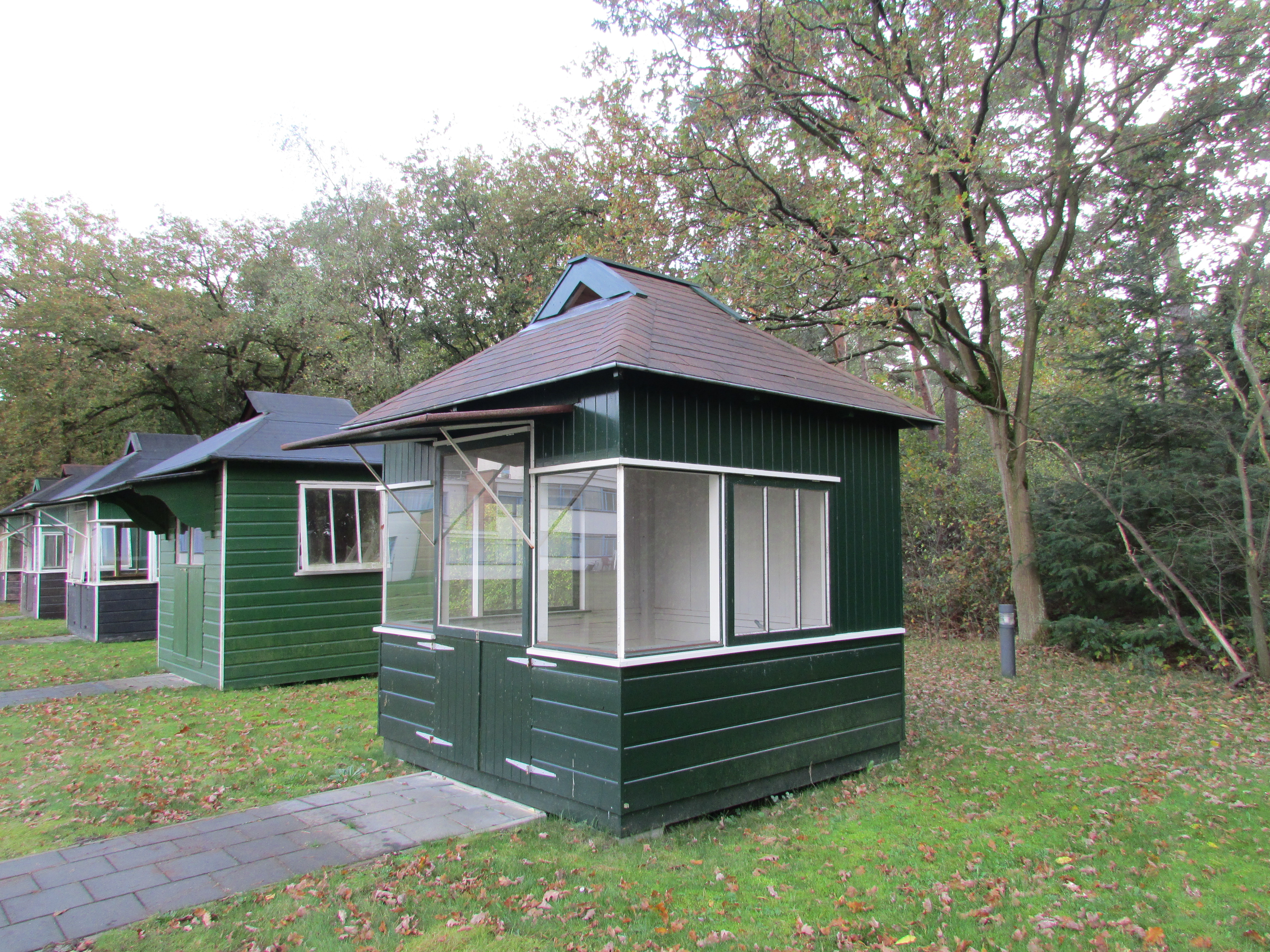
Tuberculosis hut at the former Sanatorium Zonnestraal in Hilversum

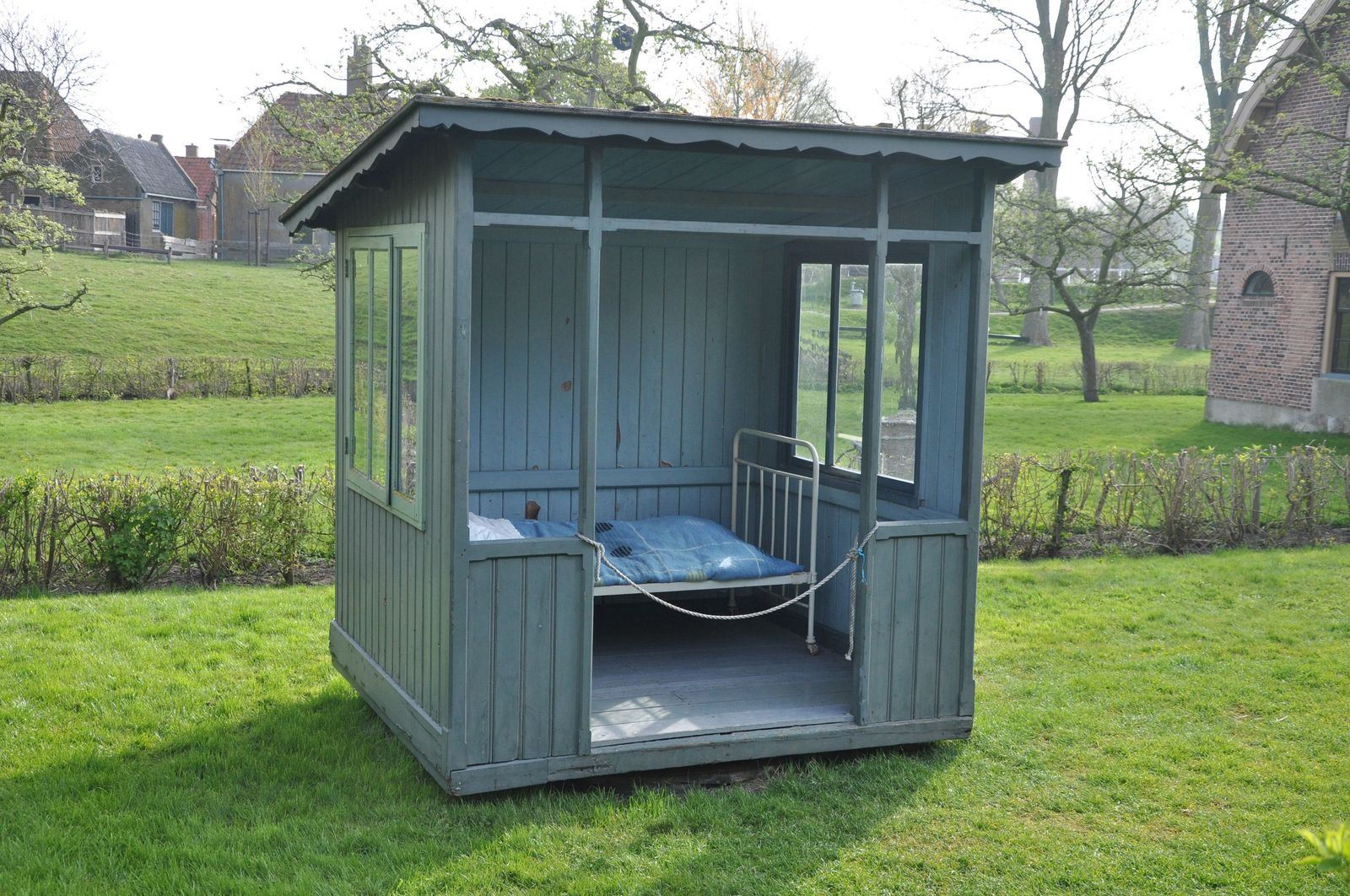
Tuberculosis hut in the Zuiderzee Museum, originally from Huizen

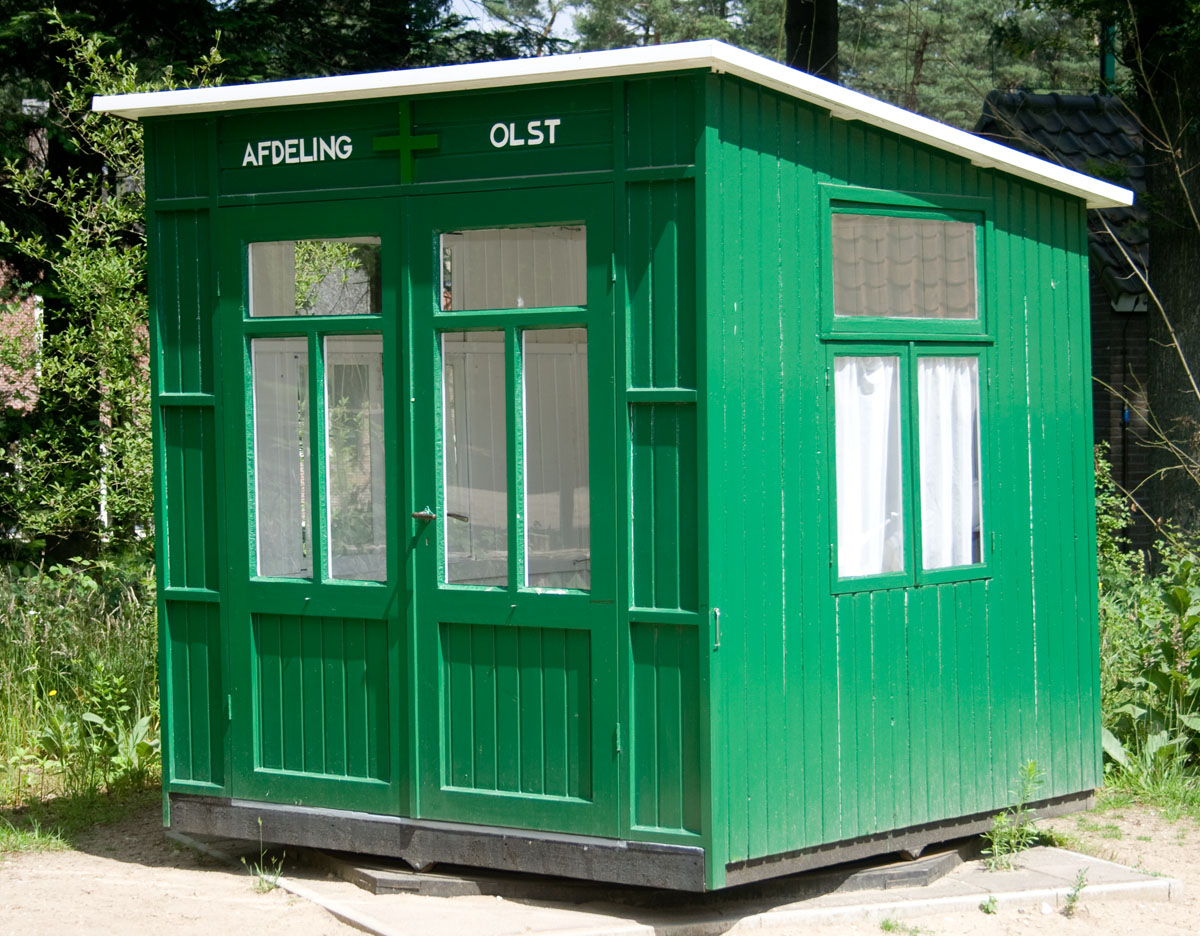
Tuberculosis hut in the Netherlands Open Air Museum, originally from Olst

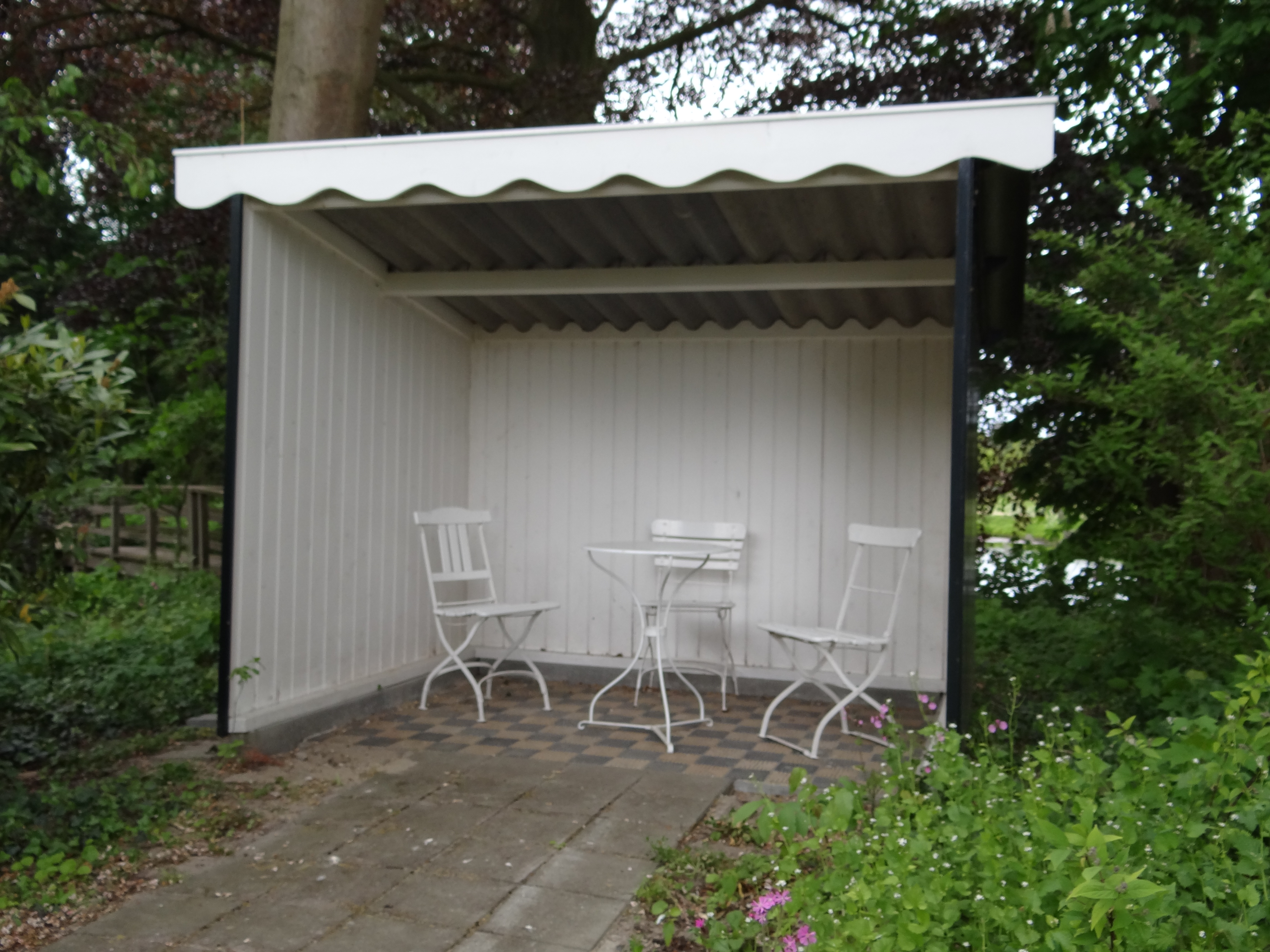
Small hut in Bredevoort

A tuberculosis hut or TB hut is a small wooden building that was used, mostly in the early twentieth century, by tuberculosis patients to recover in solitude.

== Introduction ==
By the end of the 19th century, one out of four deaths in Europe was related to tuberculosis. The disease was often associated with bad hygiene and air pollution in the cities. As a result of improvements in housing and healthcare in the beginning of the 20th century, there was a downward trend in the number of patients, but there was still no cure. Medical treatment consisted mainly of bedrest, sunlight, fresh air and healthy food. As an alternatives to treatment in a sanatorium, tuberculosis huts were introduced.

== Locations ==
In the United Kingdom and the Netherlands, the houses could be found in groups near hospitals or sanatoria. In the Netherlands, these could also be found near health associations, on farmground just outside the town center or in gardens of individuals. Once a day a nurse visited the patient for medical treatment; the family of the patient took care of the rest. The huts could be bought, borrowed or rented.

In the United States, similar huts were built in Colorado Springs. Where patients in Europe were sent to sanatoria in the Alps, patients in the United States were encouraged to cure in the fresh mountain air of Colorado Springs. Charles Fox Gardiner, a local doctor, decided to avoid any cross-contamination between patients by isolating them in small tents, instead of putting them all in one room. He developed special octahedral huts, that were placed in rows.

== Design ==
Tuberculosis huts existed in various forms, but in general they were simple premanufactured wooden buildings, that could be put together on the spot. They were white or green, with a lot of glass to allow the entering of as much sunlight as possible. On the front side, the houses were either fully open, or they contained large doors that could be opened wide. The huts in Colorado Springs were fixed to one place. The type of huts that was used in British hospitals, could be rotated on turntables towards the sun and out of the wind, to optimise the recovery conditions for the patients. In the Netherlands, both the fixed and the revolving types could be found.

== Use ==
The original purpose of the hut was that the patient could recover by resting in solitude. The patient was supposed to stay in the hut night and day, and this stay could take months or even years. The huts were acquired for other purposes too, like a summerhouse or gazebo. At least the Irish playwright George Bernard Shaw and sexologist Havelock Ellis are known to have owned a revolving "writing hut". Until the late 1940s tuberculosis patients were often put in tuberculosis huts. With the introduction of effective medication in the 1950s the huts lost their original purpose and started to serve new ones. In 1982 the collection of the Netherlands Open Air Museum was expanded with a tuberculosis hut, as a gift from the National Cross Association. One of the open-air TB huts of Montcalm Sanitarium in Manitou Springs, Colorado was donated to the Miramont Castle museum in 1998. Rijksmuseum Boerhaave in Leiden (The Netherlands) owns a hut since 2011 and Open Air Museum Het Hoogeland in Warffum (The Netherlands) owns one since April 2016.

== See also ==
- Luftkurort
