= First Battle of Mesilla =

1861 Civil War battle

Coordinates: 32.27204°N 106.80359°W

- Part of the Trans-Mississippi Theater of the American Civil War
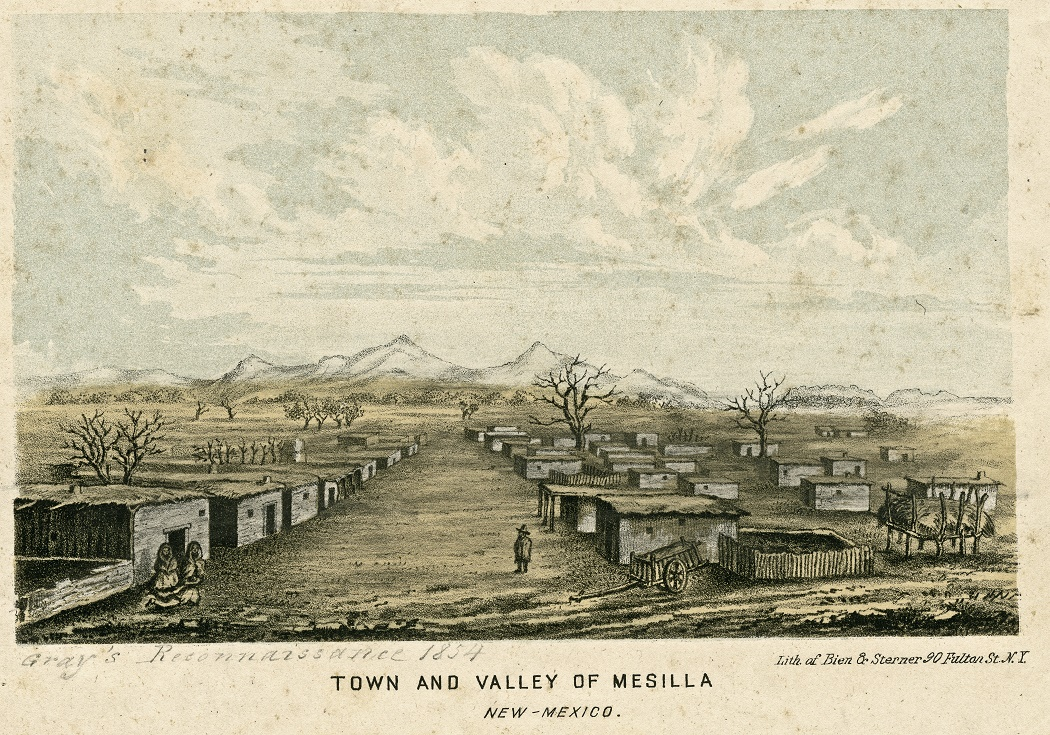
- Mesilla in 1854
| Date | July 25, 1861 |
| Location | Mesilla, New Mexico Territory (USA), Arizona Territory (CSA); Present Day: Mesilla, New Mexico |
| Result | Confederate victory |

Belligerents
| (Confederate States of America) Confederate States | United States |

Commanders and leaders
| John Baylor | Isaac Lynde |

Strength
| ~300, cavalry, infantry, militia | 380, cavalry, infantry, 4 artillery pieces |

Casualties and losses
| 2 killed, 7 wounded (disputed) | 3–13 killed, 6 wounded (disputed) |

The First Battle of Mesilla was fought on July 25, 1861, at Mesilla in New Mexico Territory, in present-day Doña Ana County, New Mexico.

It was an engagement between Confederate and Union forces during the American Civil War. The battle resulted in a Confederate victory and led directly to the establishing of a Confederate Arizona Territory, consisting of the southern portion of the New Mexico Territory. The victory paved the way for the Confederate New Mexico Campaign the following year.

== Background ==
Following the secession of Texas in February 1861 and its joining the Confederacy, a battalion of the 2nd Texas Mounted Rifles under Lieutenant Colonel John R. Baylor was sent to occupy the series of forts along the western Texas frontier which had been abandoned by the Union Army. Baylor's orders from the Department of Texas commander, Colonel Earl Van Dorn, allowed him to advance into New Mexico in order to attack the Union forts along the Rio Grande if he thought the situation called for such measures. Convinced that the Union force at Fort Fillmore would soon attack, Baylor decided to take the initiative and launch an attack of his own.

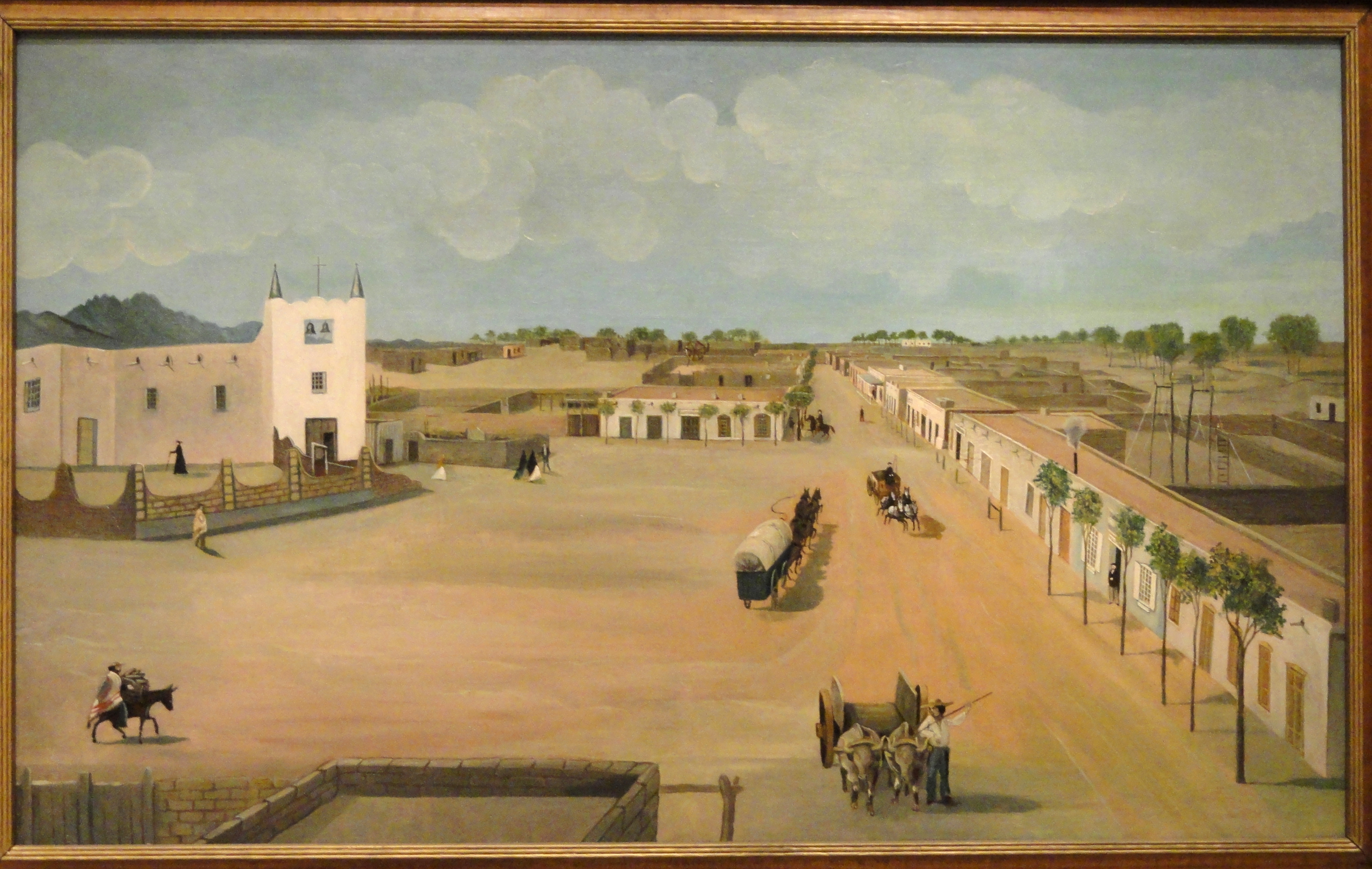
Old Mesilla, c.1885-1886

Leaving during the night of July 23, Baylor arrived at Fort Fillmore the next night, preparing to launch a surprise attack the next morning. However, a Confederate deserter informed the fort's commander, Major Isaac Lynde, of the plans. The next day, Baylor led his battalion across the Rio Grande into Mesilla, which sat at the crossroads of the two most traveled trails in the Southwest, the north–south El Camino Real de Tierra Adentro ("the Royal Road of the Interior Land") and the east-west Butterfield overland mail route. Baylor and his men were greeted with the cheers of the townspeople, who favored the Confederacy. A company of Arizona Confederates joined Baylor here, and were convinced to muster into the Confederate Army.

On July 25, leaving a small force behind to guard the fort, Lynde led 380 Regulars to the village to drive out Baylor.

== Battle ==
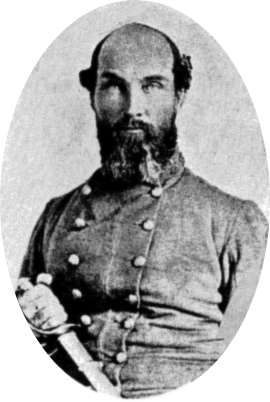
John Baylor

Lynde approached the town with his command and demanded Baylor's surrender. When Baylor refused, Lynde deployed his men into a skirmish line and opened fire with his mountain howitzers. The infantry was ordered to advance but heavy sand and corn fields interfered with this attack. Lynde then ordered his cavalry, three companies of the Regiment of Mounted Rifles, to charge Baylor's men.

The Union assault was repulsed, and both sides began skirmishing at long range. Lynde reformed his command but decided to retreat back to the fort, with the Confederates troops and armed Arizona citizens in pursuit. Lynde lost a disputed three to thirteen men killed and two officers and four men wounded, while Baylor lost a disputed two dead and seven seriously wounded with twenty horses killed.

== Aftermath ==
At sunset the next day, Baylor ordered his artillery and more cavalry to reinforce him, while the rest of his command moved into position to attack the fort the following day. During the same night, the Confederates captured 85 of the fort's horses, which formed most of the fort's transportation. Fearing an attack the next day, Lynde abandoned Fort Fillmore after destroying the ammunition and supplies in the citadel. He retreated northeast towards Fort Stanton across the dry Organ Mountains via San Augustin Pass. Many Union troops apparently had filled their canteens with the fort's medicinal whiskey instead of water, hardly wise for a summertime march across desert country.

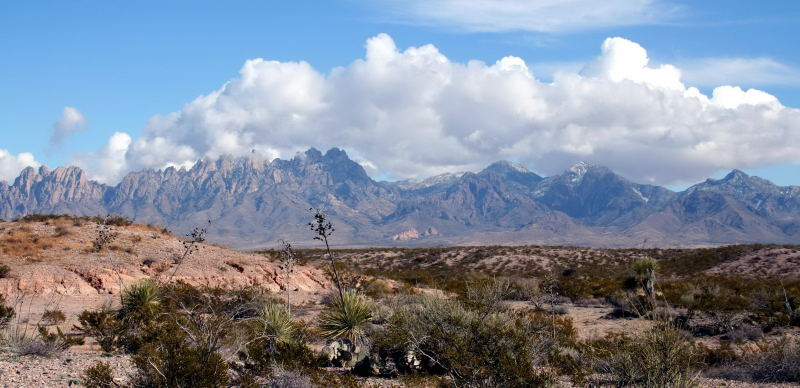
The Organ Mountains

During the pursuit the following day, the Confederates were able to capture dozens of straggling Federals. Lynde's dehydrated command, reduced to 100 men by this time, was overtaken by the Confederates, some of whom used a pass (later known as Baylor Pass) to intercept them. They were forced to surrender at San Augustine Springs on July 27. The prisoners were paroled, and Baylor concentrated his battalion at the fort. He was able to refit his command with the captured Springfield rifles and other captured equipment.

The Confederate victory at Mesilla actualized local overtures towards secession, which had been ratified by two conventions in March 1861. On August 1 Baylor declared the establishment of an organized Confederate Arizona Territory, consisting of the portion of the New Mexico Territory south of the 34th parallel north. Baylor installed himself as the new territory's military governor, and declared martial law. Baylor's success at Mesilla led to Henry Hopkins Sibley's ambitious New Mexico Campaign the following February.

On 25 November 1861 Major Lynde was, by direction of the President of the United States, Abraham Lincoln, dismissed from the army for "abandoning his post — Fort Fillmore, N. Mex. — on the 27th of July, 1861, and subsequently surrendering his command to an inferior force of insurgents".

== See also ==
- Apache Wars
- Second Battle of Mesilla
