= Fort Stanton (New Mexico) =

Former US Army fort near Lincoln, New Mexico

- U.S. National Register of Historic Places
- U.S. Historic district
- New Mexico Historic Site
- NM State Register of Cultural Properties
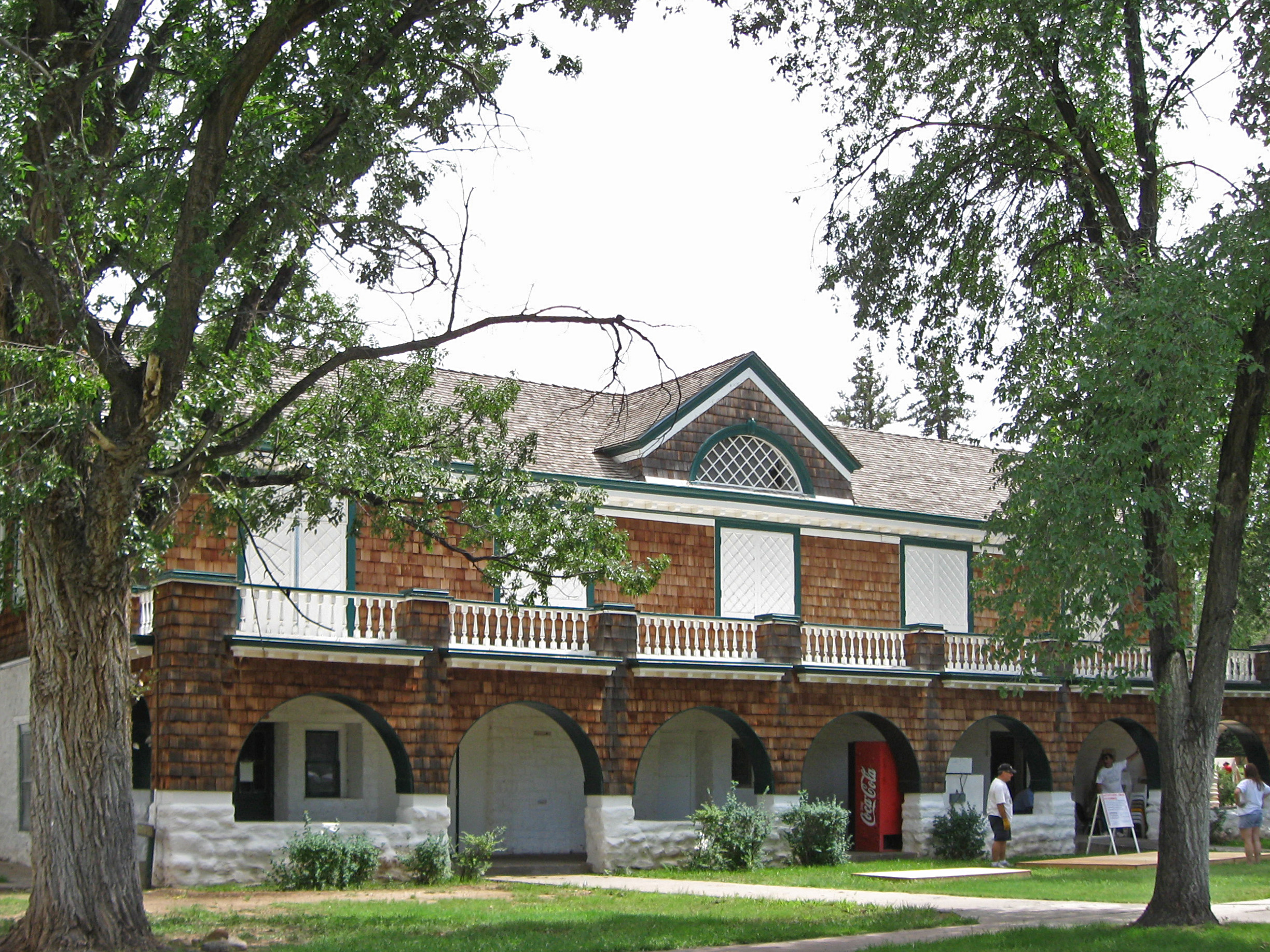
- Adjutant Office in 2009
- Interactive map of Fort Stanton
- Location: 7 miles (11 km) SE of Capitan near U.S. 380
- Nearest city: Capitan, New Mexico
- Coordinates: 33°29′40″N 105°31′35″W
- Area: 195 acres (79 ha)
- Built: 1855
- Architectural style: Colonial Revival, Mission/Spanish Revival
- NRHP reference No.: 73001142 (original); 99001679 (increase)
- NMSRCP No.: 60

Significant dates
- Added to NRHP: April 13, 1973
- Boundary increase: January 14, 2000
- Designated NMHS: August 9, 2007
- Designated NMSRCP: May 23, 1969

Fort Stanton was a United States Army fort near Lincoln, New Mexico.

== Army Fort ==
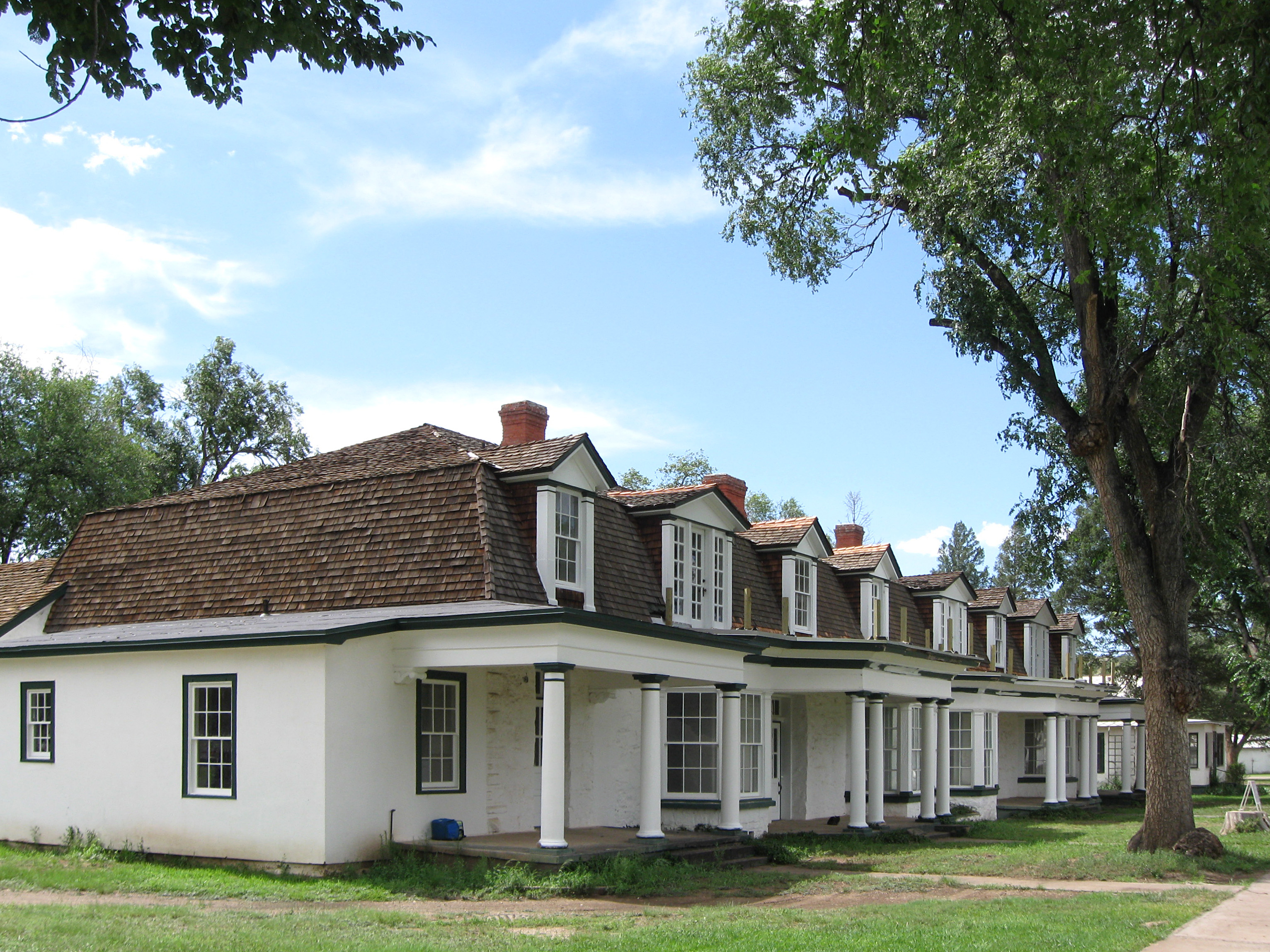
Officers Quarters in 2009

It was built in 1855 by the 1st Dragoon and the 3rd and 8th Infantry Regiments to serve as a base of military operations against the Mescalero Apaches. Numerous campaigns were fought from 1855 until the 1880s. It was established to protect Hispano and White settlements along the Rio Bonito in the Apache Wars. Kit Carson, John "Black Jack" Pershing, Billy the Kid, Pat Garrett, and Buffalo Soldiers of the 9th Cavalry all lived here.

Confederate forces occupied the outpost in 1861, at the beginning of the American Civil War. This U.S. military fortification was abandoned with the withdrawal of U.S. forces in 1896.

The fort was originally established in part as the Mescalero Apache reservation. In 1873 the reservation was moved 30 miles (48 km) southwest to its current location.

== Marine Hospital ==
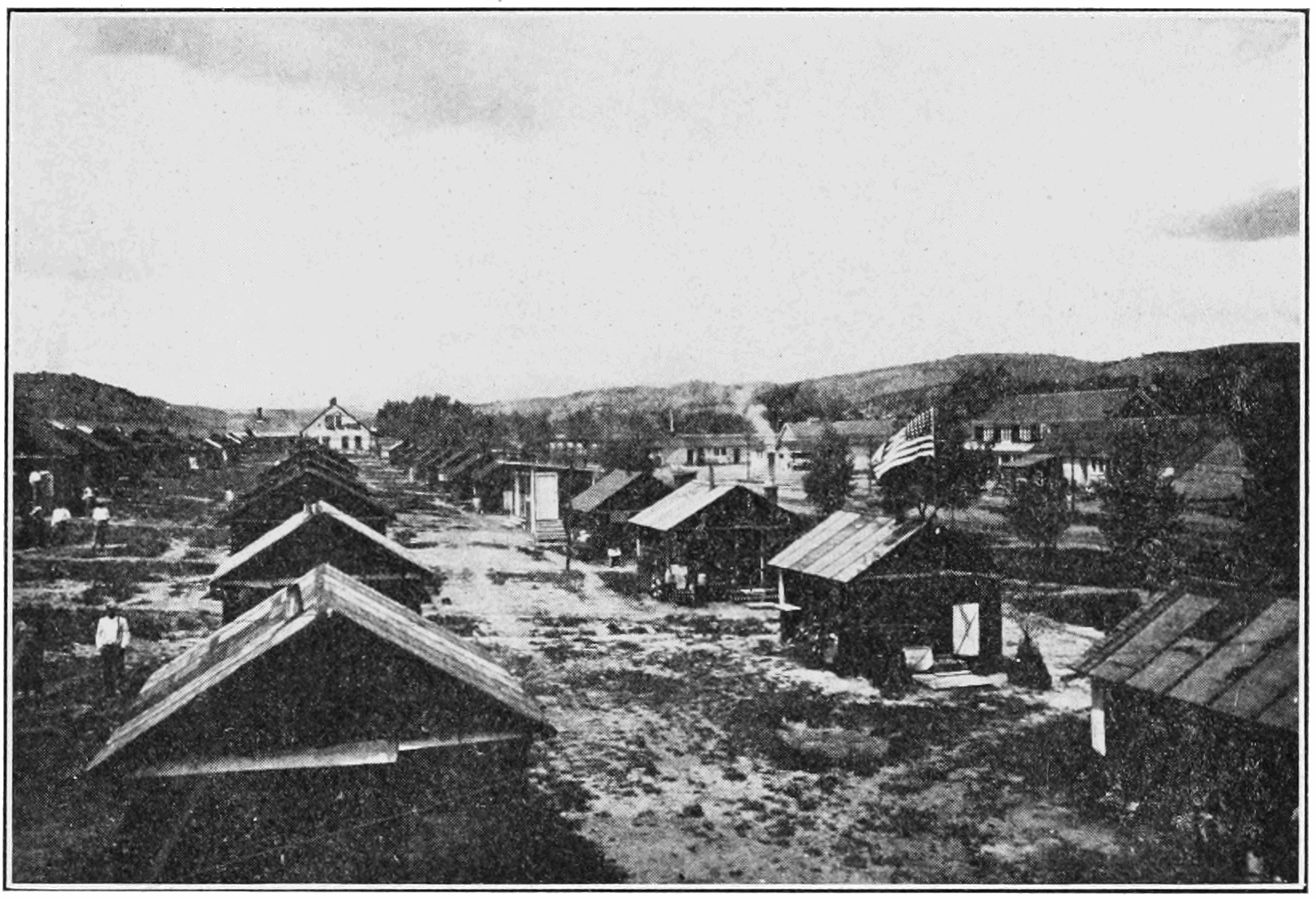
Fort Stanton around 1913

In 1899, President William McKinley transferred Fort Stanton property from the War Department to the Marine Hospital Service, converting the military reservation to America's first federal tuberculosis sanatorium.

During World War II, Fort Stanton was used as a detention center for German and Japanese Americans arrested as "enemy aliens," and 411 German nationals taken from the luxury liner Columbus in 1939 (officially recorded as "distressed seamen paroled from the German Embassy" since the U.S. was still technically neutral at the time of their capture). The "enemy aliens" were mostly immigrant residents of the U.S. who had been taken into custody as suspected saboteurs shortly after the U.S. entered the war, despite a lack of supporting evidence or access to due process for most internees. The 31 German American internees, labeled "troublemakers" by the Department of Justice, were kept separate from the 17 Japanese Americans (also deemed "troublesome" by authorities) who were transferred to Fort Stanton on March 10, 1945. These new arrivals were deported to Japan later that year.

The hospital was closed in 1953.

== Later history ==
In 2008, New Mexico governor Bill Richardson announced plans to establish Fort Stanton as a living history venue, Fort Stanton State Monument, and funds to renovate headquarters, officers quarters, and stables.

In 2009, the area around Fort Stanton and Fort Stanton Cave was designated by the U.S. Congress as a National Conservation Area (NCA), with more than 25,000 acres (10,000 ha) in order to protect a unique cave resource, Snowy River Passage in Fort Stanton Cave National Natural Landmark. Snowy River was discovered in 2001 by members of the Fort Stanton Cave Study Project. The new NCA, called Fort Stanton – Snowy River Cave, is managed by the Bureau of Land Management, Roswell Field Office. The NCA has over 90 miles (140 km) of multi-use trails for horseback riding, mountain bike riding and hiking. It is the venue of an annual endurance riding event that has grown to be 6 days long. The NCA is joined on its south and northeast boundaries by the Smokey Bear Ranger District of the Lincoln National Forest.

In 2012, members of the Southwestern Region of the National Speleological Society completed a restoration project on the second floor balcony of Building #9, located on the Fort Stanton Quadrangle.

In 2019, a team from AmeriCorps National Civilian Community Corps along with Fort Stanton Staff renovated and restored Fort Stanton's Hidalgo Building into a volunteer dormitory, began restoration on the historic school house, restored an original TB Hut, and expanded the hospital's current exhibit to include two new exhibits.

== See also ==
- Escape from Fort Stanton
- Ruidoso, New Mexico
- Capitan, New Mexico
- Lincoln National Forest
- Battle of Mesilla (disambiguation)
- Gallinas Massacre
- National Register of Historic Places listings in Lincoln County, New Mexico
