= John R. Baylor =

American military officer and politician (1822–1894)

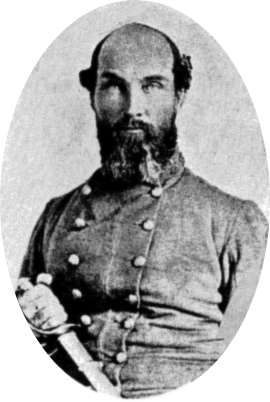
- Baylor in uniform, c. 1861

Member of the C.S. House of Representatives from Texas's 5th congressional district
- In office May 2, 1864 – May 26, 1865
- Preceded by: M. D. Graham
- Succeeded by: Constituency abolished

1st Governor of Arizona Territory (Confederate)
- In office August 1, 1861 – March 17, 1862
- Preceded by: Dr. L. S. Owings (provisional)
- Succeeded by: Dr. L. S. Owings (in exile)

Personal details
- Born: John Robert Baylor; July 27, 1822 Paris, Kentucky, U.S.
- Died: February 6, 1894 (aged 71) Uvalde County, Texas, U.S.
- Resting place: Church of the Ascension, Uvalde County, Texas, U.S. 29°32′21.5″N 100°00′44.4″W
- Party: Democratic
- Relatives: George Baylor (great-uncle); George Wythe Baylor (brother); R. E. B. Baylor (uncle)

Military service
- Allegiance: Confederate States
- Branch/service: Confederate States Army
- Years of service: 1861–1865
- Rank: Colonel
- Commands: 2nd Texas Cavalry Regiment
- Battles/wars: American Civil War: First Battle of Mesilla; Battle of Picacho Peak; Battle of Galveston

John Robert Baylor (July 27, 1822 – February 6, 1894) was a US Indian agent, publisher and editor, politician, and a senior officer of the Confederate States Army. After being dismissed as Indian agent, he became one of the founding editors of The White Man, a newspaper in North Texas, and a strong critic of Governor Sam Houston.

During the American Civil War, Baylor led Texas Confederate forces into New Mexico and declared himself the 1st Governor of the Arizona Territory. He was confirmed by Confederate President Jefferson Davis. In an altercation, Baylor attacked and killed Robert Payne Kelley, an editor of a rival newspaper who ridiculed Baylor. Davis disapproved of orders Baylor gave his regiment to exterminate the Apache in his territory and removed him from office as governor, stripping him of his Texas commission.

Later Baylor recovered, settling in San Antonio. He was elected to state government as a legislator and became a rancher. In 1881 he killed another man in an argument when he was about 59 but was acquitted at trial. He died years later at his ranch.

== Early life ==
John R. Baylor was born in Paris, Kentucky, in 1822, the son of a United States Army surgeon and his wife. He had a brother, George Wythe Baylor, who followed their father into military service, later achieving the rank of colonel. The boys grew up with their family on the various military posts where their father was posted as an assistant surgeon in the Seventh Infantry. Their uncle, R.E.B. Baylor, became an associate judge on the Texas Supreme Court and co-founder of Baylor University. A great-uncle was Col. George R. Baylor, who had served in the American Revolution.

== Move to Texas ==
John Baylor moved to Fayette County, Texas, at the age of 18 and made his life there. In 1840, he joined a Texas volunteer army to fight against the Comanche Indians. In 1844 he married Emily Hanna in Marshall, Texas, and the couple had seven sons and three daughters. His brother George also ended up in Texas.

While living as a rancher in Texas, Baylor decided to try his hand at politics and was elected to the Texas state legislature in 1851, serving from 1852 to 1854. In 1853, he was admitted to the bar. He was appointed as the agent to the Comanches in 1855 and held that position until his dismissal in 1857. After his dismissal, he traveled around the state condemning the Comanches and addressing anti-Indian meetings. During this time, he edited an anti-Indian newspaper, The White Man, and organized a vigilante force of around 1,000 men to campaign against the Comanches.

John Baylor was appointed as a US Indian agent in Jack County, serving from 1856 to March 1857, when he was dismissed. He became a critic of Governor Sam Houston, saying he was not doing enough to defend settlers in North Texas from the Comanche and Lipan Apache.

He was elected to the state legislature and, by 1860, became a co-founding publisher and editor of a local newspaper called The White Man, which advocated the expulsion of Indians from North Texas. Based in Jacksboro, it had the advantage of being in a town that was a stop on the Butterfield Overland Mail Route and was estimated to reach 1,000 readers.

== American Civil War ==
After Texas declared secession from the United States, Baylor accepted a commission as a Confederate lieutenant colonel in command of the 2nd Texas Cavalry Regiment (also known as the 2nd Texas Mounted Rifles). His force pushed to the southwest into New Mexico Territory and occupied Fort Bliss.

=== Governor of Arizona Territory (1861–1862) ===
Following his victory at the First Battle of Mesilla (July 25, 1861), and the surrender of U.S. forces in the area, Baylor proclaimed himself as the governor of Arizona Territory, a region encompassing the southern half of contemporary New Mexico and Arizona. The Confederate Congress confirmed his position, and he was promoted to colonel in 1861. On January 18, 1862, the fledgling territory was formally organized by the Confederate States.

Soon, a disagreement over critical articles in the Mesilla Times led to a fight between Baylor and the editor, Robert P. Kelly, whom he killed. Attorney General Marcus H. MacWillie, a member of Baylor's state cabinet, officially pardoned him for the homicide. MacWillie was rewarded when Baylor orchestrated the former AG's election to the 1st Confederate States Congress.

Baylor became known for ordering his cavalry regiment to exterminate the Apache, with whom the encroaching settlers conflicted. He issued the following order to his men:

[U]se all means to persuade the Apaches or any tribe to come in for the purpose of making peace, and when you get them together kill all the grown Indians and take the children prisoners and sell them to defray the expense of killing the adult Indians. Buy whiskey and such other goods as may be necessary for the Indians and I will order vouchers given to cover the amount expended. Leave nothing undone to insure success, and have a sufficient number of men around to allow no Indian to escape.

When news of this order reached Confederate President Jefferson Davis, he relieved Baylor as governor and revoked his commission as colonel.

Davis's March 23, 1863, note to the Secretary of War was:

This letter requires attention. It is an avowal of an infamous crime and the assertion of what should not be true in relation to troops in Texas, &c.

=== C.S. House of Representatives (1863–1865) ===
Baylor later was elected to the 2nd Confederate States Congress, serving from 1863 to 1865, representing Texas. He regained his commission as colonel and was raising a new force to recapture the Arizona Territory when the American Civil War ended two weeks later.

== Later life ==
In the postwar years, Baylor settled in San Antonio, Texas. In 1873, he unsuccessfully campaigned for the Democratic party's nomination for governor of Texas, losing to Richard Coke.

In 1876, during the height of the Black Hills War, Baylor offered his services to the U.S. Army against the Lakota Sioux.

In 1878, he established a sizable ranch in Uvalde County. He prospered but continued to be involved in violent confrontations and reputedly killed a man in the early 1880s in a feud over livestock. This killing happened in Uvalde County; the victim was named Gilchrist. Baylor was never charged with the crime.

He died at his ranch on February 6, 1894, aged 71.

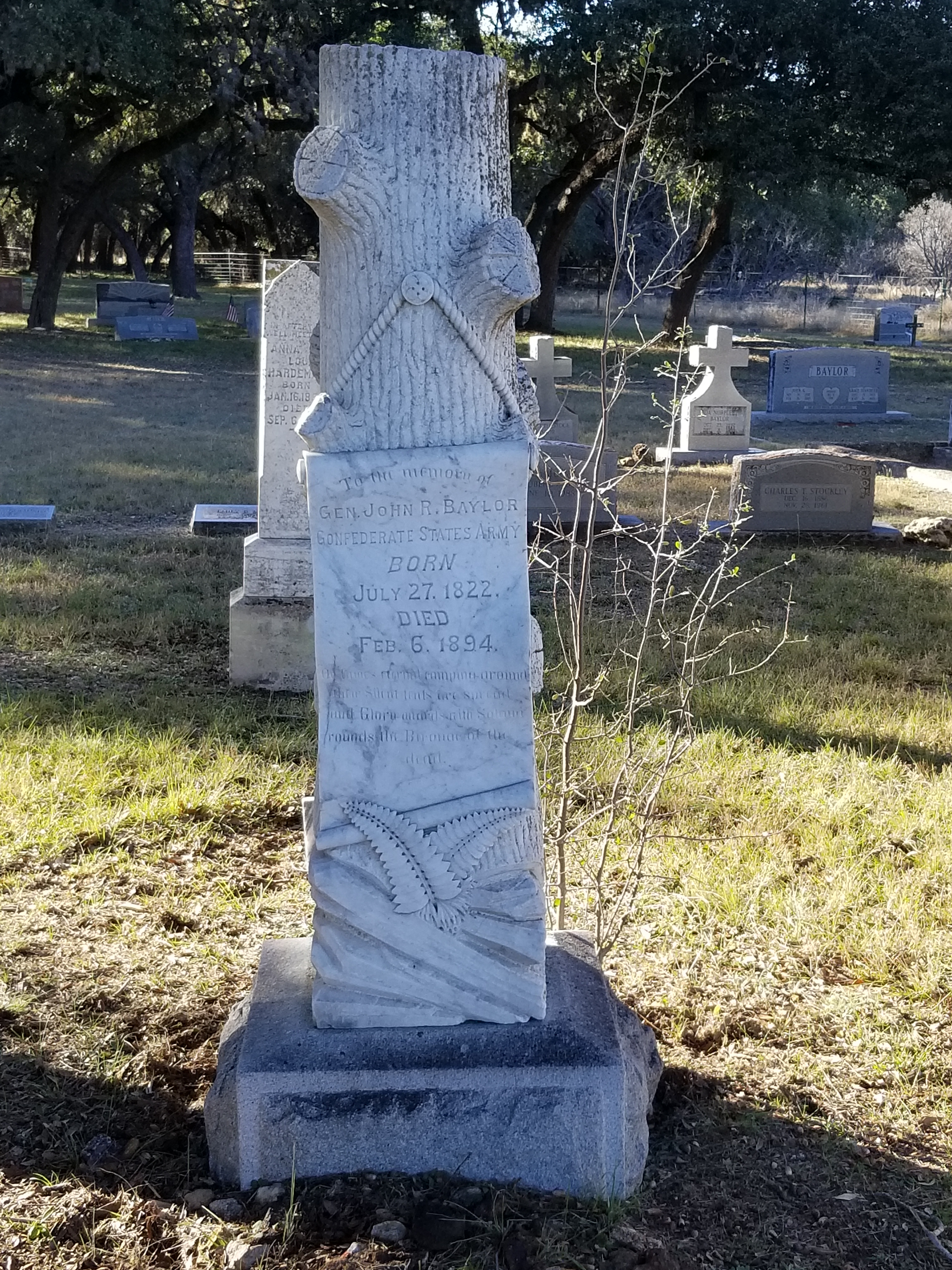

== Notes ==
Government offices
Preceded by Dr. L. S. Owings; Provisional	Governor of Arizona Territory (Confederate); 1861–1862	Succeeded by Dr. L. S. Owings in exile
Confederate States House of Representatives
Preceded by M. D. Graham	Member of the C.S. House of Representatives from Texas's 5th congressional district 1864–1865	Constituency abolished
Military offices
Preceded by Colonel Charles L. Pyron	Commanding officer of the 2d Texas Cavalry Regiment; 1865	Regiment disbanded
