= Basilica of San Albino =

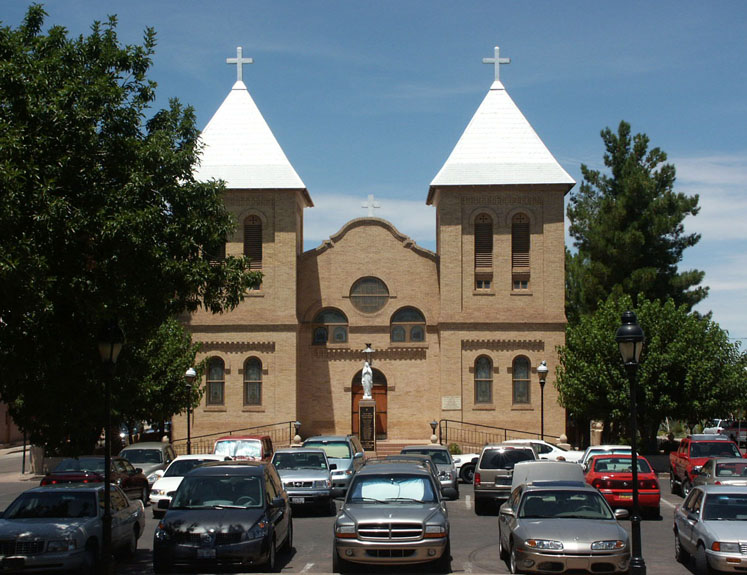
- View of front from Mesilla Plaza

- Location within New Mexico
- 32.27472°N 106.79583°W
- Location: Mesilla, New Mexico
- Country: United States
- Denomination: Roman Catholic
- Website: http://www.sanalbino.org

History
- Former name: San Albino Church of Mesilla
- Status: Basilica
- Founded: 1852
- Founder: Ramón Ortíz
- Dedication: Albinus of Angers

Architecture
- Functional status: Active
- Style: Romanesque
- Groundbreaking: 1906
- Completed: 1908

Administration
- Archdiocese: Santa Fe
- Diocese: Las Cruces
- Parish: San Albino

The Basilica of San Albino (Spanish: Basílica de San Albino), formerly known as San Albino Church of Mesilla, is part of the Roman Catholic Diocese of Las Cruces and is located in Mesilla, New Mexico. It has the distinction of having originally been established in Mexico, but it is now located in the United States as a result of a transfer of territory in the Gadsden Purchase. The first church on the site was built in 1852; the current structure was built in 1906, and is one of the oldest churches in the region. Daily Masses are held in both Spanish and English.

== Appearance ==
The basilica stands on the north side of Mesilla Plasa, and is Constructed of fired brick, with a bell tower on each front corner. Leaded stained-glass windows depict saints, while geometric designs decorate the walls of the nave. The parapet between the bell towers incorporate elements of mission style architecture.

During renovation and stabilization work in the 1960s, the plaster was removed from both the interior and exterior walls exposing the underlying brick work. A memorial honoring parishioners who died in combat stands near the main entrance. The church is surrounded by a low stone wall.

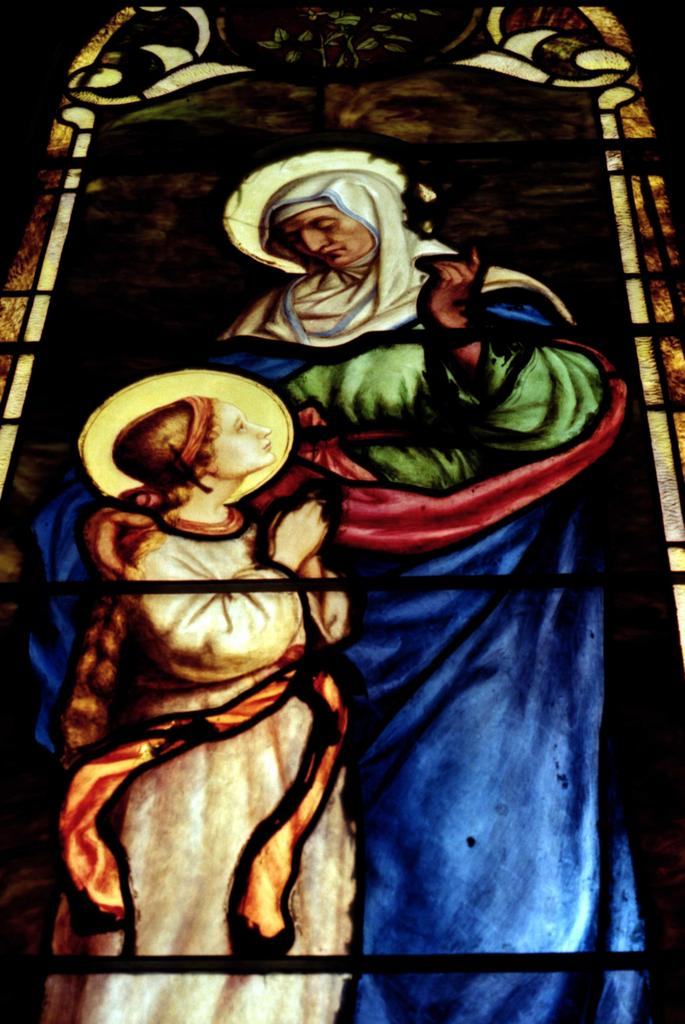
Stained glass inside Basilica of San Albino

== History ==
After the conclusion of the Mexican–American War in 1846, the town of Mesilla was established sometime around 1850 on the Mexican side of the newly established Mexican–American border, by refugees from former Mexican territory that had been ceded to the United States. A priest, Ramón Ortiz y Miera, was appointed to be Commissioner of Emigration to assist in resettling these Mexican citizens. The Mexican government ordered the church established in 1852 to support local residents. The settlers soon constructed a church on the south side of Mesilla's central plaza. This first building was constructed of mud and logs, and dedicated to the Breton Saint Albinus of Angers (Albino in Spanish), who was born in Vannes, France in 469.

Following the Gadsden Purchase in 1854, Mesilla and portions of present-day southern Arizona and New Mexico became United States territory. At this point, the church was transferred to the diocese that is now the Roman Catholic Archdiocese of Santa Fe. The shepherd of this four-year-old diocese at this time was a Frenchman, Bishop Jean Baptiste Lamy. Lamy was instrumental in the growth of a number of churches in his diocese. As part of this growth, a new San Albino church was constructed on the north side of the plaza with French architecture.

Plaque commemorating the designation of San Albino Church as a minor basilica

In 1872, the parish became part of the Vicariate Apostolic of Arizona, under another Frenchman, Rev. Jean-Baptiste Salpointe. It was during this time, in 1876, that the first bell for the church was commissioned.

The present church constructed in 1908 on the same site. San Albino subsequently divided into a second dioceses; from the Roman Catholic Diocese of El Paso in 1916, to the Roman Catholic Diocese of Las Cruces in 1982.

In 2008, from substantial efforts of a few parishioners summitted the required history and other information to the Vatican's Congregation for Divine Worship and the Discipline of the Sacraments which lead to granting San Albino the designation of minor basilica.
