= Second Battle of Mesilla =

1862 Civil War battle in Mesilla, New Mexico Territory

Coordinates: 32°16′N 106°48′W

- Part of the Trans-Mississippi Theater of the American Civil War
Date	July 1, 1862
Location	Mesilla, Confederate Arizona; Modern Day: Mesilla, New Mexico
Result	Union victory

Belligerents
(Confederate States of America) Confederate States	United States

Commanders and leaders
(Confederate States of America) Captain Sherod Hunter; Colonel. Steel; Capt. Cleaver †	unknown

Strength
Company A, Herbert's Battalion of Arizona Cavalry; 7th Texas Infantry	New Mexican guerillas Pueblo Indians

Casualties and losses
7–12, lost several horses and their equipment, including 2 pieces of artillery	20–40

The Second Battle of Mesilla was an engagement during the American Civil War. It was fought on July 1, 1862, and was the last engagement between pro-Union and Confederate forces in the Arizona Territory.

Following their flight from the Battle of Albuquerque and the advance of Union forces from California into Arizona, Confederate troops were in retreat from Union Arizona and Northern New Mexico, and were greatly in need of supplies.

Retreating forces at the Confederate capitol of Mesilla had scoured the territory, taking cattle and crops from locals, New Mexican and Puebloan alike. A battle took place in the Town, resulting in the death of 20 citizens of Mesilla. Following this, skirmishes began on the outskirts of the town with the New Mexican guerillas capturing 2 pieces of Confederate artillery and successfully running the rebels out of the area. Accounts suggest that seven to twelve Confederates were killed, including their commander Capt. Cleaver of the 7th Texas Infantry and as many as 40 locals, though it is unclear how many of the New Mexican casualties were combatants.

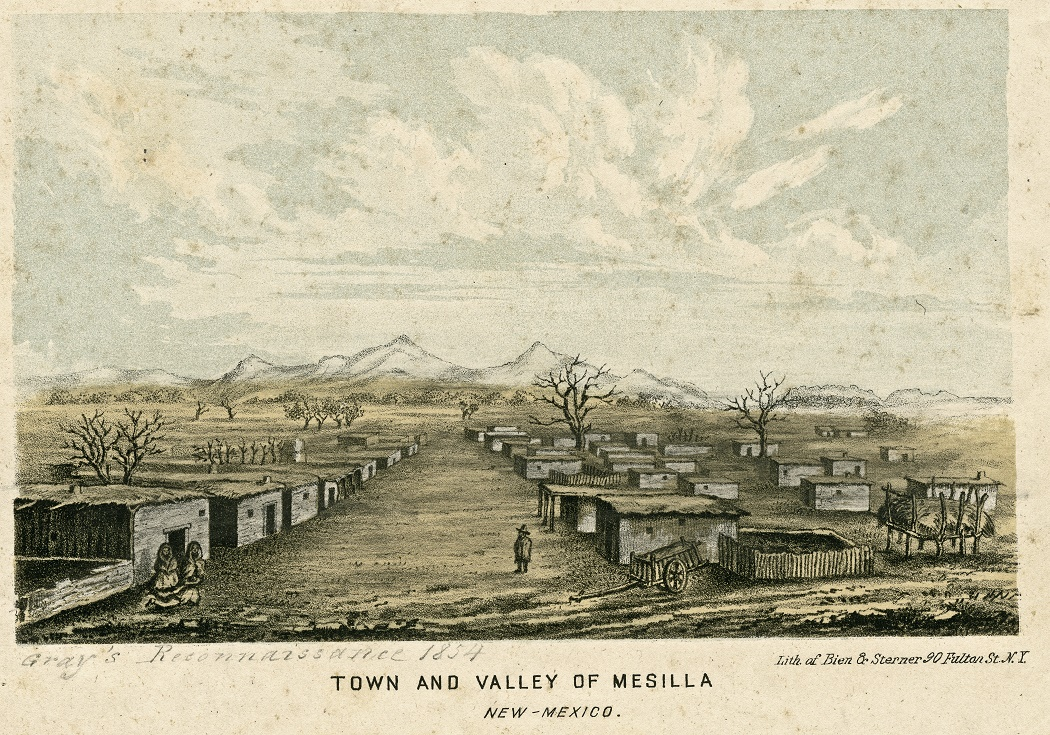
Mesilla in 1854

The first Union officers arriving in Mesilla received a warm welcome and found the population happy to engage in commerce, readily digging up money and other resources hidden in advance of the Confederate retreat. A large party of New Mexicans and Puebloans continued to pursue the rebels as they moved South to El Paso. Hearing of the advance of the California Column, Confederate forces retreated further to San Antonio with little discipline and poor morale. They traveled across the territory with few supplies, having lost much at the Battle of Glorieta Pass and abandoned more in the retreat from Albuquerque, and arrived having lost around 1700 of the force of 3700. They were covered by Herbert's Battalion of Arizona Cavalry acting as rearguard.

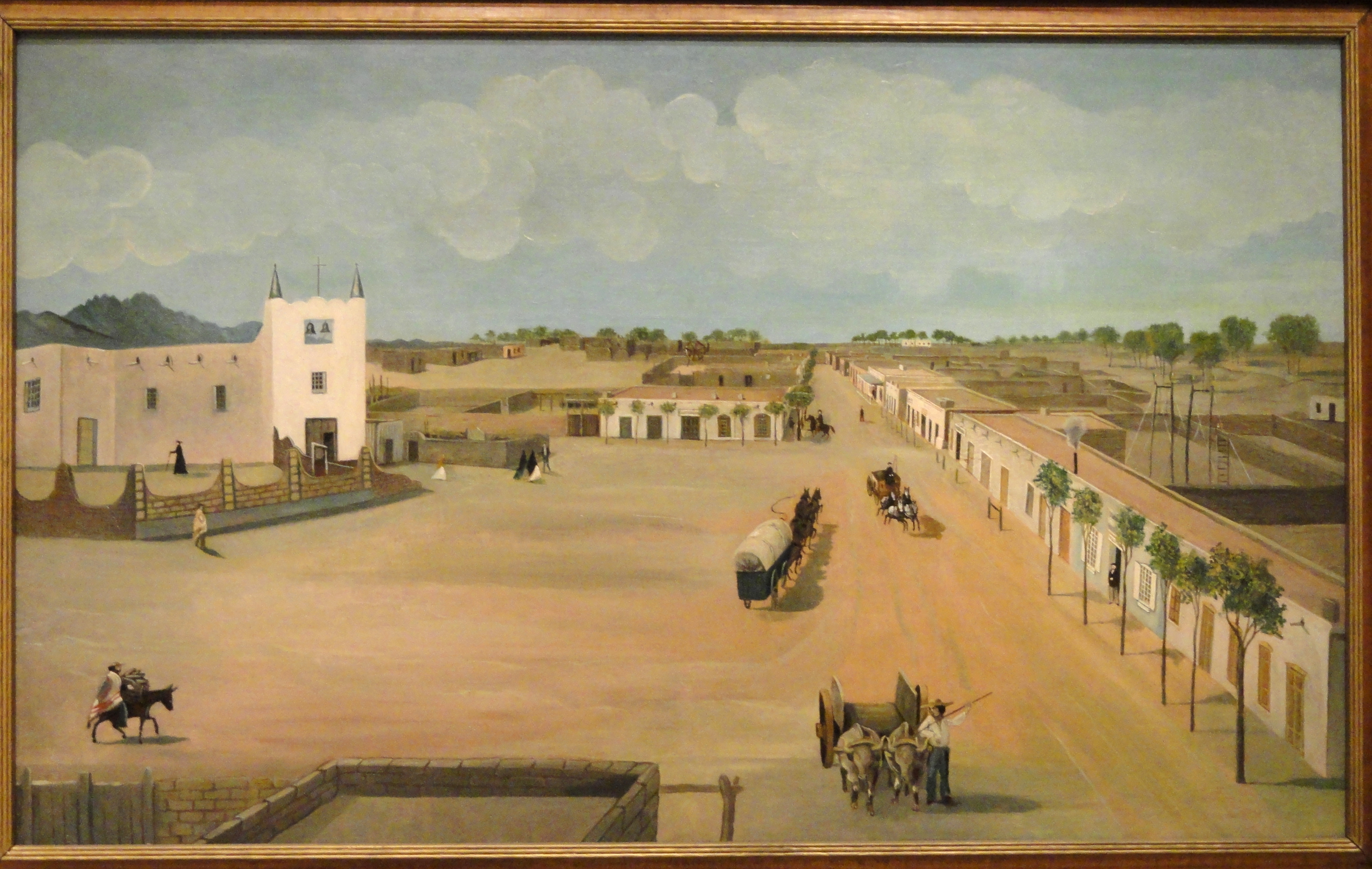
Mesilla c.1885–1886

== See also ==
- First Battle of Mesilla
- Battle of Glorieta Pass
- New Mexico Campaign
