= Mesilla, New Mexico =

Town in New Mexico, United States

Mesilla
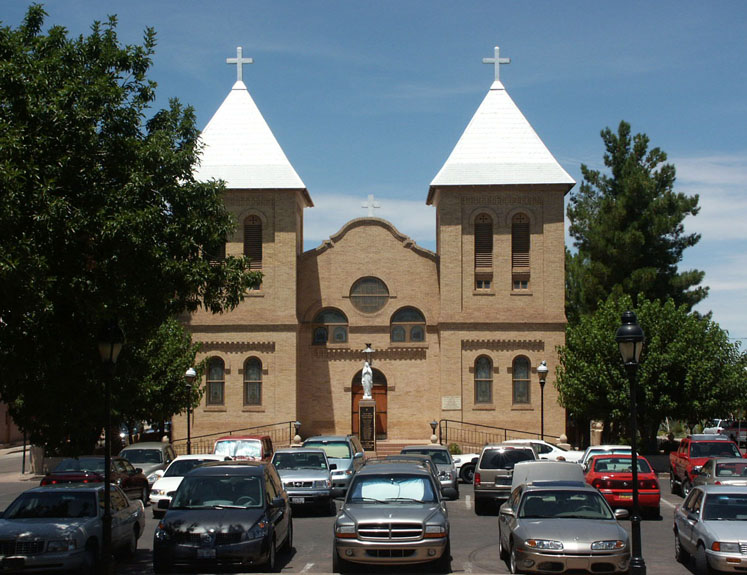
- Basilica of San Albino, on the Mesilla plaza

- Location within Doña Ana County and New Mexico

- Location in the United States
- Coordinates: 32°15′32″N 106°48′53″W
- Country: United States
- State: New Mexico
- County: Doña Ana

Government
  - Mayor: Russell Hernandez

Area
  - Total: 5.68 sq mi (14.71 km^{2})
  - Land: 5.68 sq mi (14.71 km^{2})
  - Water: 0 sq mi (0.00 km^{2})
- Elevation: 3,881 ft (1,183 m)

Population (2020)
  - Total: 1,797
  - Density: 316.4/sq mi (122.18/km^{2})
- Time zone: UTC-7 (Mountain (MST))
  - Summer (DST): UTC-6 (MDT)
- ZIP code: 88046
- Area code: 575
- FIPS code: 35-48060
- GNIS feature ID: 2412988
- Website: mesillanm.gov

Mesilla (also known as La Mesilla and Old Mesilla) is a town in Doña Ana County, New Mexico, United States. The population was 1,797 at the 2020 census. It is part of the Las Cruces Metropolitan Statistical Area.

During the Civil War, Mesilla briefly served as capital of the Confederate Territory of Arizona.

The Mesilla Plaza is a National Historic Landmark.

== History ==
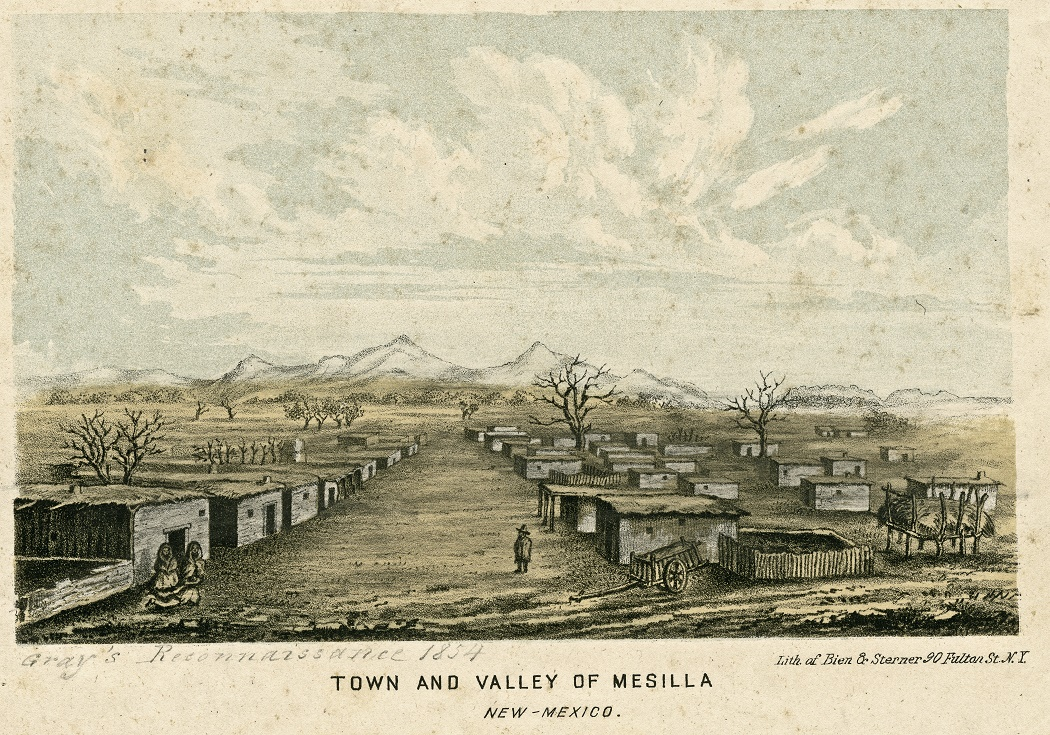
Mesilla in 1854

The first permanent settlement in Mesilla was established by 116 settlers from Chihuahua in the 1840s led by Pablo Melendres.

The village of Mesilla was incorporated in 1848, after the Treaty of Guadalupe Hidalgo moved the U.S.–Mexico border south of the village of Doña Ana, placing it in the United States. A small group of citizens, unhappy at being part of the United States, decided to move south of the border. They settled in Mesilla at this time.

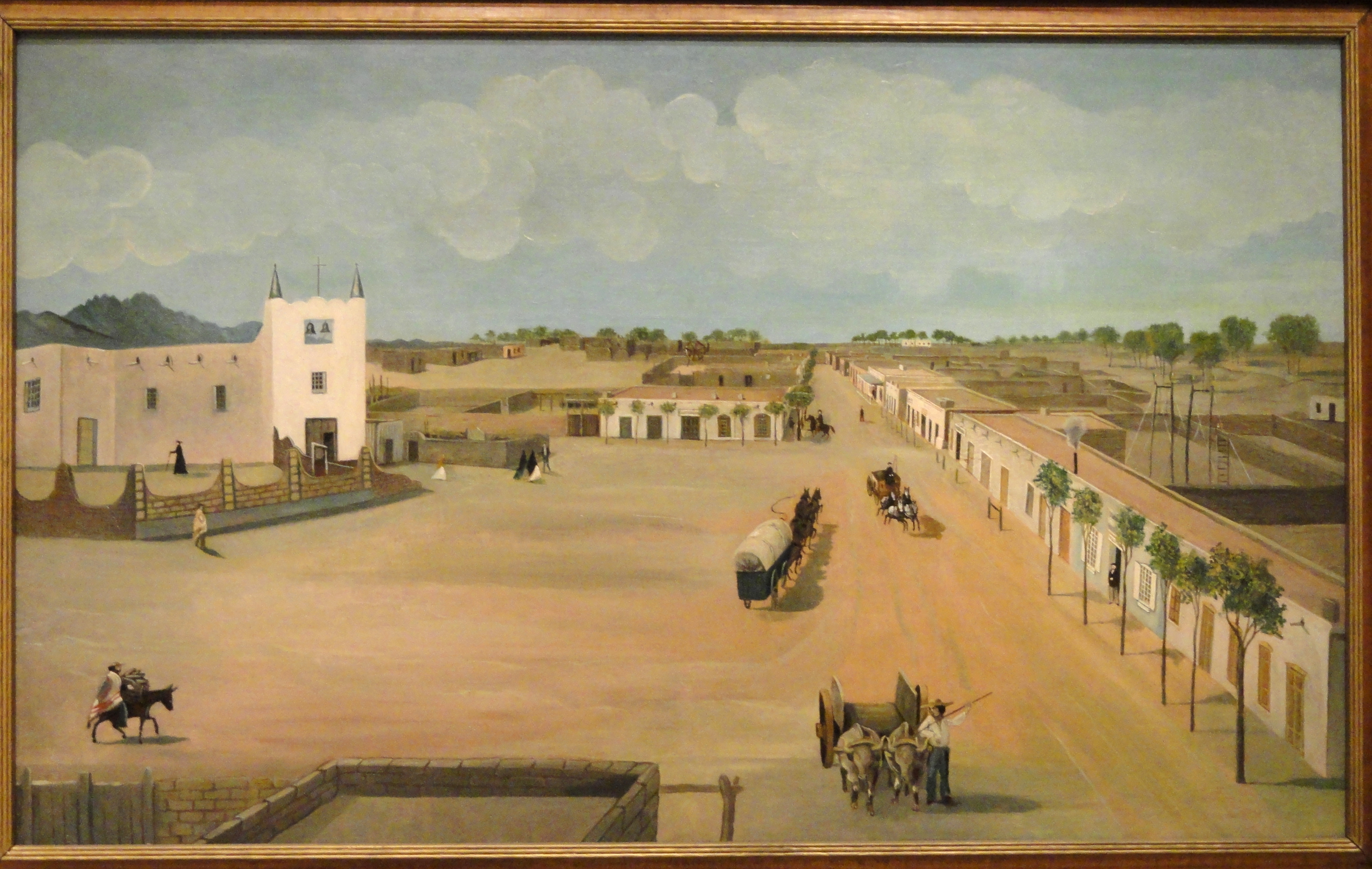
Mesilla, c.1885-1886

By 1850, Mesilla was an established colony. By this time, its people were under constant threat of attack from the Apache. By 1851, the attacks caused the United States to take action to protect its people just to the north of the border, in the Mesilla Valley. They did this by creating Fort Fillmore. As a result of the fort, the United States declared the Mesilla Valley region part of the United States. Mexico also claimed this strip of land, causing it to become known as "No Mans Land". This boundary dispute, which was officially caused by a map error, was resolved in 1853 with the Gadsden Purchase. Mesilla became a part of the United States, as well as the southern part of New Mexico and Arizona.

Historical population
Census	Pop.	Note	%±
1950	1,264		—
1960	1,264		0.0%
1970	1,713		35.5%
1980	2,029		18.4%
1990	1,975		−2.7%
2000	2,180		10.4%
2010	2,196		0.7%
2020	1,797		−18.2%
U.S. Decennial Census

Two battles were fought at or in the town during the Civil War. Mesilla served as the capital of the Confederate Territory of Arizona in 1861–1862 and was known as the "hub", or main city for the entire region. Recaptured by the Volunteers of the California Column, it then became the headquarters of the Military District of Arizona until 1864.

During the Wild West era, Mesilla was known for its cantinas and festivals. The area attracted such figures as Billy the Kid, Pat Garrett and Pancho Villa. The village was also the crossroads of two major stagecoach, mail, and trade routes: the Butterfield Stagecoach and the Camino Real de Tierra Adentro. The village of Mesilla was the most important city of the region until 1881, and at about 2,000 residents was the largest city at the time between San Antonio and San Diego.

In 1871 a riot between the supporters of two rival candidates, José Francisco Chaves and José Manuel Gallegos to serve as territorial representative to the United States Congress, resulted in the death of nine men and nearly 50 men injured. The anger over the riot was so intense that many moved away from the town, with some migrating to the valley of the Mimbres River, and others moving over the border to the town of Ascension in Mexico, just over the border from Columbus, New Mexico. This was the worst political riot in New Mexican history.

In 1881, the Santa Fe Railway was ready to build through the Gadsden Purchase region of the country. Mesilla was naturally seen as the city the railroad would run through. However, the people of Mesilla asked for too much money for the land rights, and a landowner in nearby Las Cruces, a much smaller village than Mesilla, stepped in and offered free land. The city of Mesilla has not grown much since, and Las Cruces has grown to a population of an estimated 111,000 people by 2020, and is currently the second largest city in New Mexico.

La Mesilla Historic District, which includes Mesilla Plaza, was declared a National Historic Landmark in 1961. The Fountain Theatre, except for 12 years, has been in operation since the early 1900s.

In 2008, the Roman Catholic parish church of San Albino was raised to the status of minor basilica by the Holy See.

The gazebo in the center of the plaza was torn down and rebuilt due to unnoticed structural problems that made the gazebo unsafe. Demolition started in October 2013 and rebuilding ending in May 2014 for the annual "Cinco de Mayo" celebration.

== Geography ==
Mesilla is located near the geographic center of Doña Ana County. It is bordered to the northeast by the city of Las Cruces. According to the United States Census Bureau, the town has a total area of 6.7 square miles (17.4 km^{2}), all land. The Rio Grande passes through the western part of the town.

== Demographics ==
As of the census of 2000, there were 2,180 people, 892 households, and 595 families residing in the town. The population density was 407.0 inhabitants per square mile (157.1/km^{2}). There were 981 housing units at an average density of 183.1 per square mile (70.7/km^{2}). The racial makeup of the town was 74.0% White, 0.2% African American, 1.0% Native American, 0.2% Asian, 0.1% Pacific Islander, 20.7% from other races, and 3.8% from two or more races. Hispanic or Latino of any race were 52.2% of the population.

There were 892 households, out of which 26% had children under the age of 18 living with them, 54% were married couples living together, 9% had a female householder with no husband present, and 33% were non-families. 28% of all households were made up of individuals, and 9% had someone living alone who was 65 years of age or older. The average household size was 2.4 and the average family size was 3.0.

In the town, the population was spread out, with 22% under the age of 18, 8% from 18 to 24, 23% from 25 to 44, 29% from 45 to 64, and 17% who were 65 years of age or older. The median age was 43 years. For every 100 females, there were 90.9 males. For every 100 females age 18 and over, there were 90.7 males.

The median income for a household in the town was $42,275, and the median income for a family was $51,181. Males had a median income of $30,500 versus $25,000 for females. The per capita income for the town was $25,922. About 6% of families and 9% of the population were below the poverty line, including 7% of those under age 18 and 6% of those age 65 or over.

== Education ==
Las Cruces Public Schools is the local school district.

The district operates Mesilla Elementary School and Zia Middle School which are within Mesilla town limits.

== Gallery ==
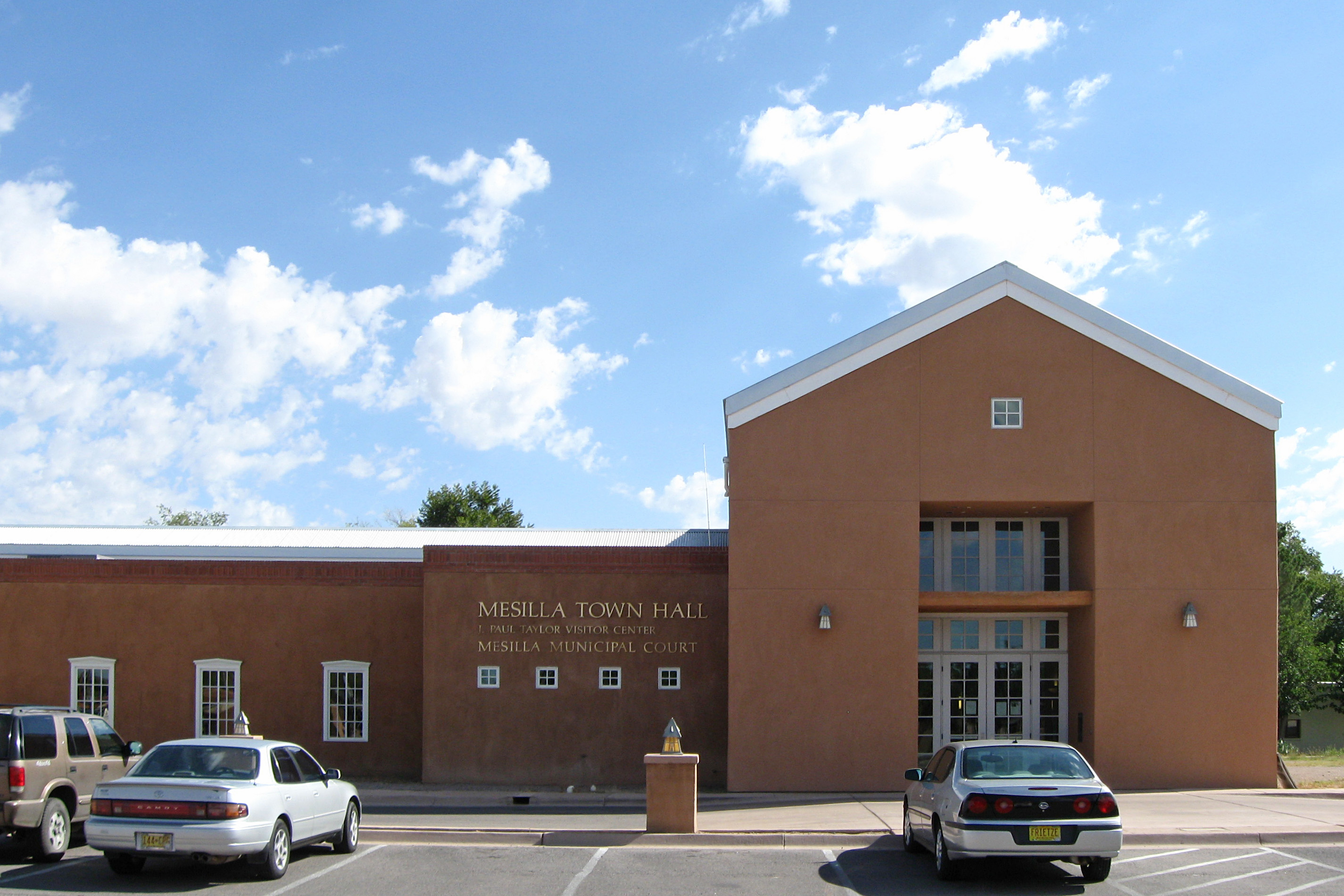
Mesilla Town Hall

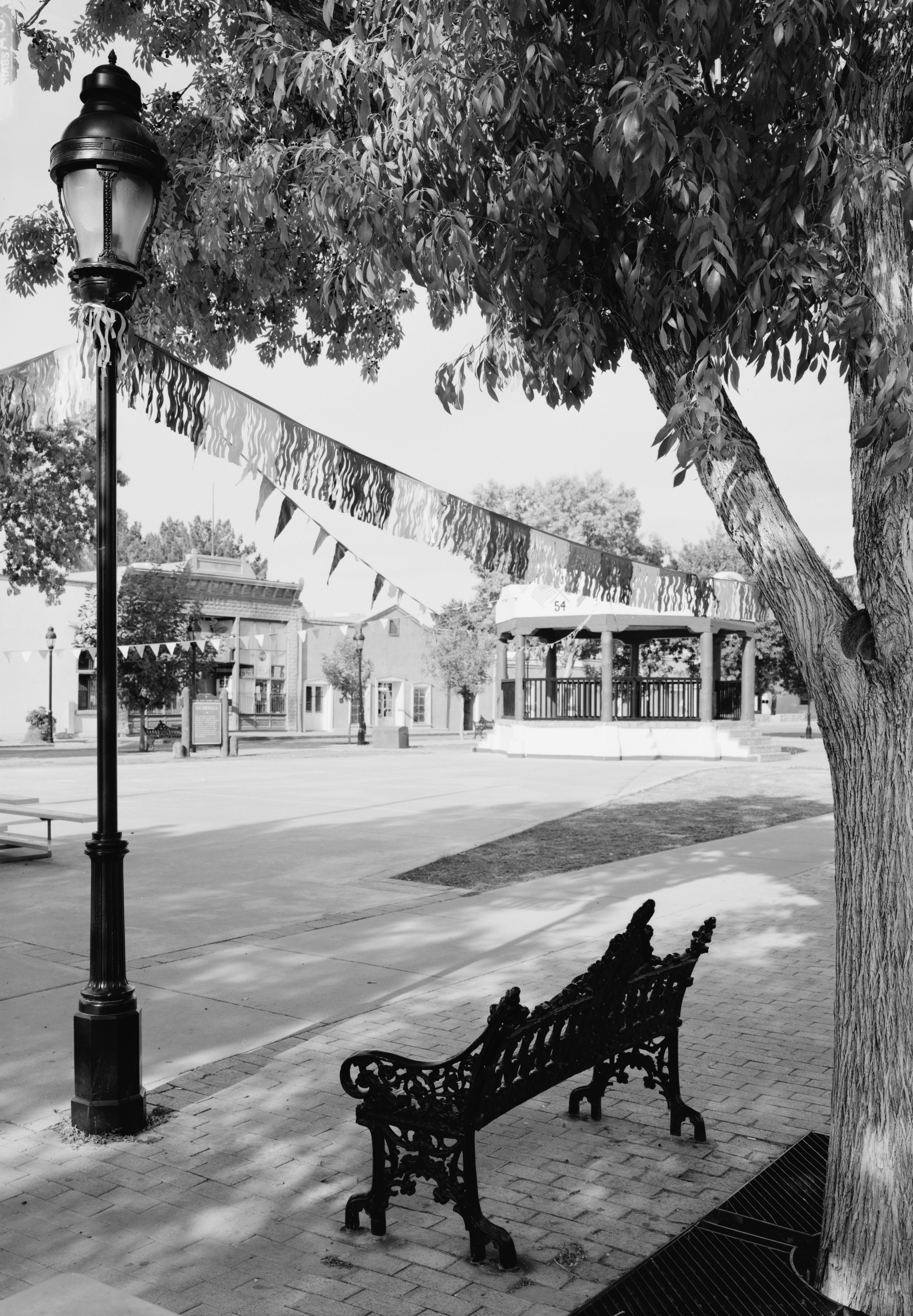
Mesilla Plaza, looking northwest, 2005

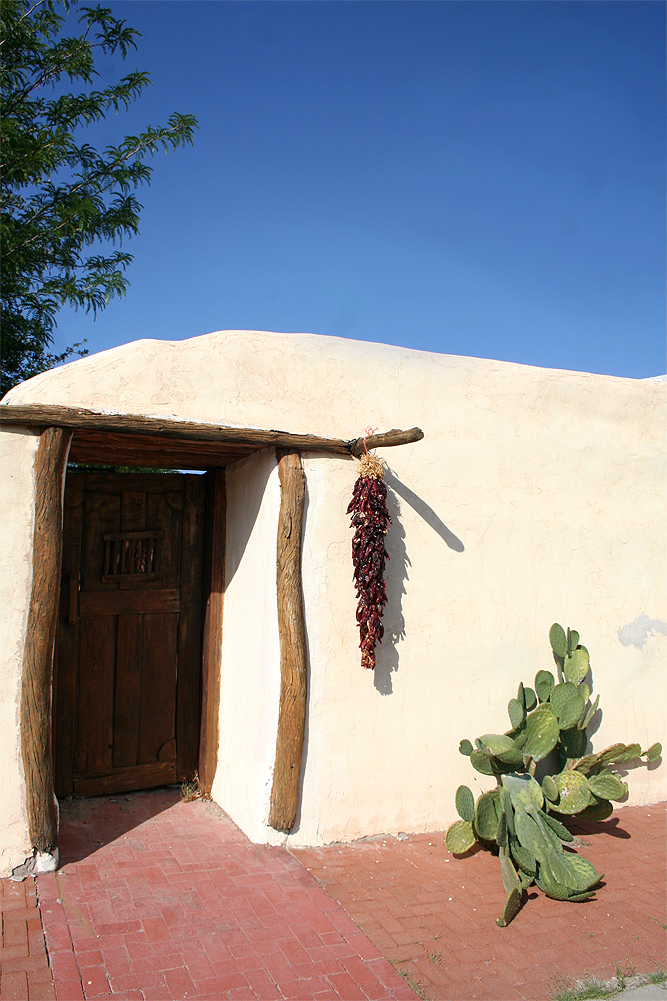
Mesillan adobe house, with decorative ristra

== See also ==
- First Battle of Mesilla
- Second Battle of Mesilla
