= 3rd Cavalry Regiment (United States) =

Armored cavalry regiment of the 1st Cavalry Division, US Army

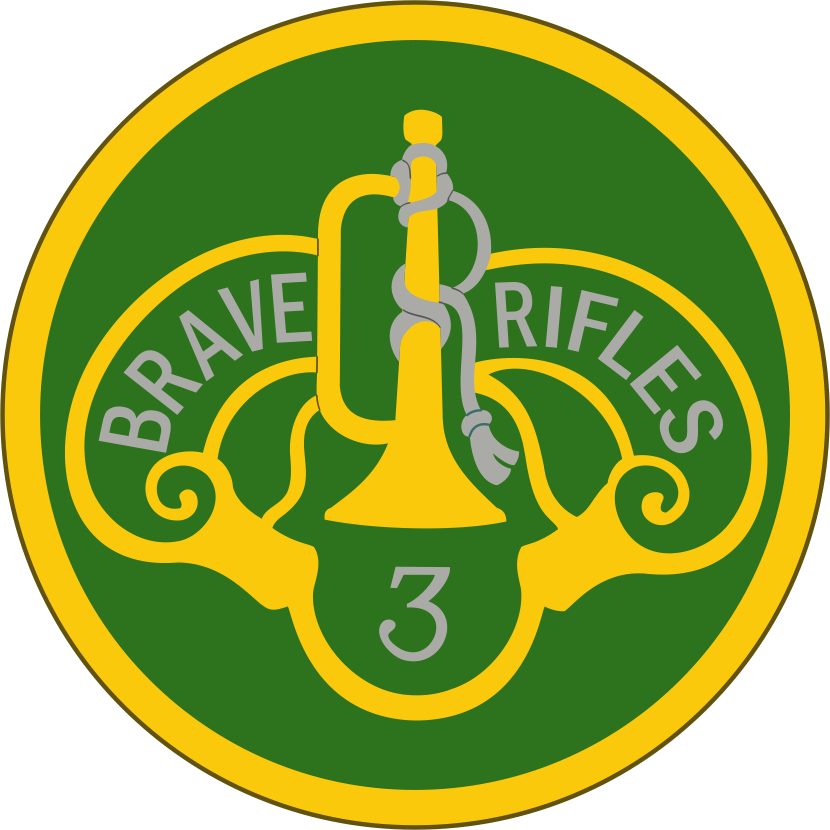
- Shoulder sleeve insignia
- Active: 1846–present
- Country: United States
- Branch: United States Army
- Role: Stryker Brigade
- Part of: 1st Cavalry Division
- Garrison/HQ: Fort Hood, Texas
- Nickname: Brave Rifles
- Mottos: Blood and Steel
- Engagements: Indian Wars; Mexican–American War; American Civil War; War with Spain; Philippine Insurrection; Pancho Villa Expedition; World War I; World War II; Gulf War; Iraq; Anbar campaign (2003–2011); Battle of Tal Afar; Afghanistan; Operation Inherent Resolve

Commanders
- Current commander: Colonel William Chastain
- Notable commanders: Persifor F. Smith; Thomas Devin; Washington L. Elliot; Anson Mills; Hugh L. Scott; Guy Henry Sr. Guy Henry Jr. William J. Glasgow; Kenyon A. Joyce; Jonathan Wainwright; John Millikin; George S. Patton; James H. Polk; Martin E. Dempsey; H. R. McMaster; Michael A. Bills; Kevin D. Admiral

Insignia
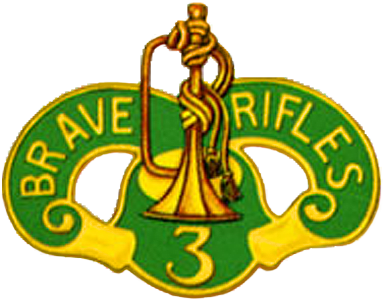
- Regimental distinctive insignia

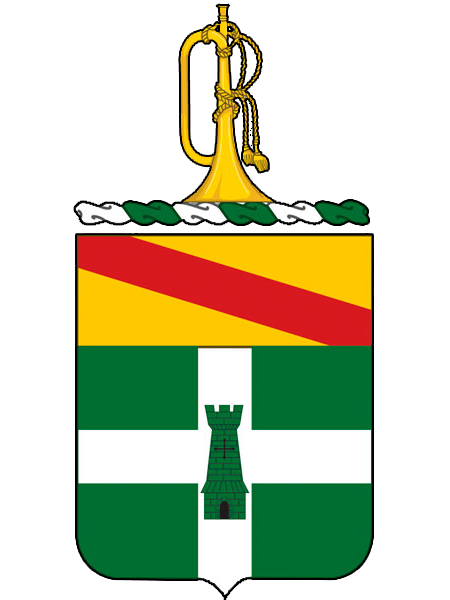
- Regimental Coat of arms

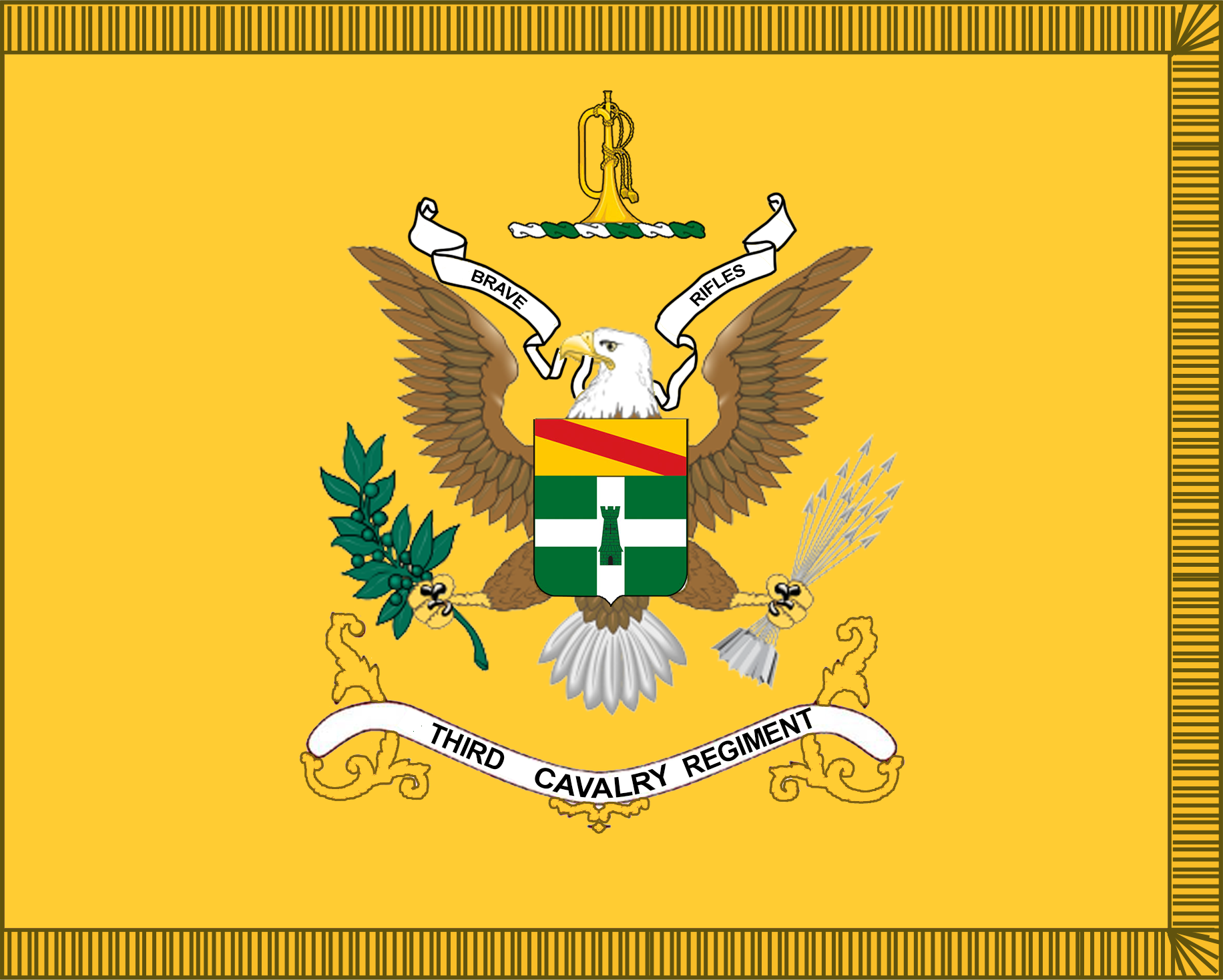
- 3rd Cavalry Regiment Flag

The 3rd Cavalry Regiment, formerly 3d Armored Cavalry Regiment ("Brave Rifles") is a regiment of the United States Army currently stationed at Fort Hood, Texas.

The regiment has a history in the United States Army that dates back to 19 May 1846, when it was constituted in the Regular Army as the Regiment of Mounted Riflemen at Jefferson Barracks, Missouri. This unit was reorganized at the start of the American Civil War as the 3d U.S. Cavalry Regiment on 3 August 1861. In January 1943, the regiment was re-designated as the 3d Cavalry Group (Mechanized). Today, they are equipped with Stryker vehicles. The 3d Armored Cavalry Regiment was the last heavy armored Cavalry Regiment in the U.S. Army until it officially became a Stryker regiment on 16 November 2011. It retains its lineage as the 3d Cavalry Regiment.

Under various names it has seen action during eleven major conflicts: the Indian Wars, the Mexican–American War, the American Civil War, the Spanish–American War, the Philippine–American War, World War I, World War II, the Persian Gulf War, SFOR in Bosnia, Operation Iraqi Freedom, Operation New Dawn, Operation Enduring Freedom, Operation Freedoms Sentinel, and most recently Operation Inherent Resolve.

Twenty-three of the regiment's troopers received the Medal of Honor, all awarded for gallantry in action between 1871 and 1898. The list includes William "Buffalo Bill" Cody, whose award was rescinded in 1916 for not being a member of the military. Cody's medal was reinstated in 1989.

Most of the regiment was deployed to Afghanistan from 2016 - February 2017.

3d Cavalry Regiment was assigned to the 1st Cavalry Division from March 2017 to October 2022 and then to the III Armored Corps. The regiment was reassigned to the 1st Cavalry Division as part of the Army 2030 reform.

== Organization ==
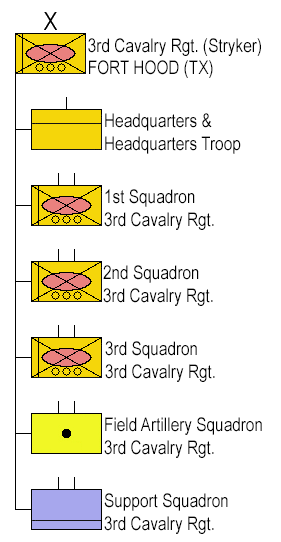
Structure the 3d Cavalry Regiment

In 2011, the 3d Cavalry Regiment changed its structure to fit that of a Stryker Brigade Combat Team (SBCT) with its "Change of Mission." At this time, the Regiment consisted of seven squadrons. The four cavalry squadrons were divided into cavalry troops with the field artillery squadron having batteries and the rest of the units having troops. There is a Regimental Headquarters and Headquarters Troop, four Cavalry Squadrons, a Field Artillery Squadron, and a Support Squadron. In the beginning of 2025, the Army once again restructured the 3d Cavalry Regiment and Longknife and Pioneer Squadrons would be disbanded (those elements would move to a higher echelon). All of Longknife's Troops were retired, but several of Pioneer Squadron's specialty Troops (including its Signal and Military Intelligence Troops) were reorganized under Steel Squadron.

- Regimental Headquarters and Headquarters Troop (Remington)
- 1st Squadron (Tiger) 1/3d CR
  - Headquarters and Headquarters Troop (Roughrider)
  - A Troop (Apache Troop) – Infantry Troop
  - B Troop (Bandit Troop) – Infantry Troop
  - C Troop (Crazyhorse Troop) – Infantry Troop
  - D Troop (Dragon Troop) – Forward Support Troop (FST)
- 2nd Squadron (Sabre) - 2/3d CR
  - Headquarters and Headquarters Troop (Rattler)
  - E Troop (Eagle Troop) – Infantry Troop
  - F Troop (Fox Troop) – Infantry Troop
  - G Troop (Grim Troop) – Infantry Troop
  - H Troop (Heavy Troop) – Forward Support Troop (FST)
- 3rd Squadron (Thunder) - 3/3d CR
  - Headquarters and Headquarters Troop (Havoc Hounds)
  - I Troop (Ironhawk Troop) – Infantry Troop
  - K Troop (Killer Troop) – Infantry Troop
  - L Troop (Lightning Troop) – Infantry Troop
  - M Troop (Maddog Troop) – Forward Support Troop (FST)
- Field Artillery Squadron (Steel) - RFAS
  - Headquarters and Headquarters Battery (Brimstone)
  - A Battery (King) – M777
  - B Battery (Lion) – M777
  - C Battery (Regulator) – M777
  - Signal Troop (Centurion)
  - Military Intelligence Troop (Ghostrider)
  - Service Battery (Caisson) – Forward Support Troop (FST)
- Regimental Support Squadron (Muleskinner) - RSS
  - Headquarters and Headquarters Troop (Bullwhip)
  - Supply and Transportation Troop (Packhorse)
  - Engineer Troop (Pioneer)
  - Maintenance Troop (Blacksmith)
  - Medical Troop (Scalpel)

== History ==
=== Origins ===
The Regiment of Mounted Riflemen was authorized by an Act of Congress on 1 December 1845 and was formed at Jefferson Barracks, Missouri. The president signed the bill in law on 19 May 1846 and COL Persifor F. Smith was placed in command. Thus came into existence a new organization in the United States Army: a regiment of riflemen, mounted to provide greater mobility than the infantry and equipped with Model 1841 percussion rifles to provide greater range and more accurate firepower than the infantry's muskets or the dragoon's carbines. The Mounted Riflemen were considered a separate branch of service at the time and wore green piping with a trumpet for the branch insignia.

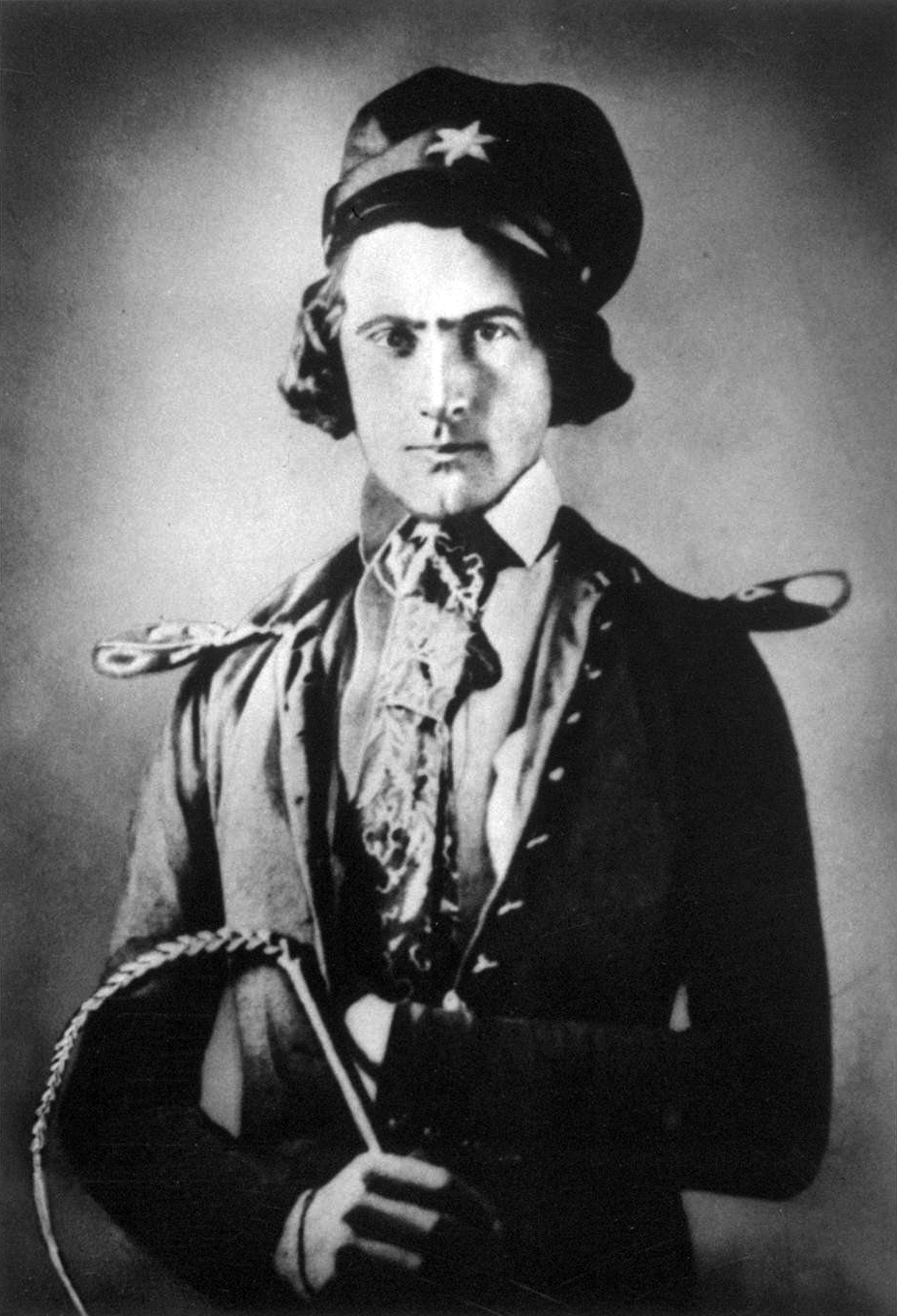
Lieutenant Cave J. Couts in 1843 of the "Mounted Rifles"

When the Regiment of Mounted Riflemen was organized pursuant to the act of Congress in 1846, the first companies filled were A, B, C, and D. They would not be designated as troops until 1883 and would later make up the core of 1st (Tiger) Squadron, 3d Cavalry Regiment. Companies C and F were recruited from the mountains of Pennsylvania, Maryland, Virginia, and North Carolina, I Company was formed in New Orleans, Louisiana, and the rest of the regiment was recruited from Ohio, Indiana, Illinois, Kentucky, and Tennessee.

"Bandit Troop" (then B Company) is the regiment's senior troop. It was organized 1 August 1846, and consisted of 1-Captain, 1-1st Lieutenant, 1-2nd Lieutenant, 1-Brevet 2Lt, and 75 enlisted men. "Crazyhorse Troop" (then C Company) was organized next on 1 September 1846, with Captain Samuel H. Walker as its commander. He is listed as being "on detached service at Washington, obtaining equipment and recruits for Company" until 21 May 1847. No doubt the "equipment" he was obtaining was the shipment of 1,000 Colt-Walker revolvers he had co-designed with Samuel Colt. "Apache Troop" (then A Company) completed its organization 1 October 1846. Captain William Wing Loring was the first Commander of A Company, and would later become the regiment's 2nd colonel, before resigning his commission to serve the Confederacy. "Dragon Troop" (then D Company) was organized 4 October 1846 with 3 officers and 61 enlisted. Captain Henry Pope was the first commander of D Company.

=== Mexican–American War ===
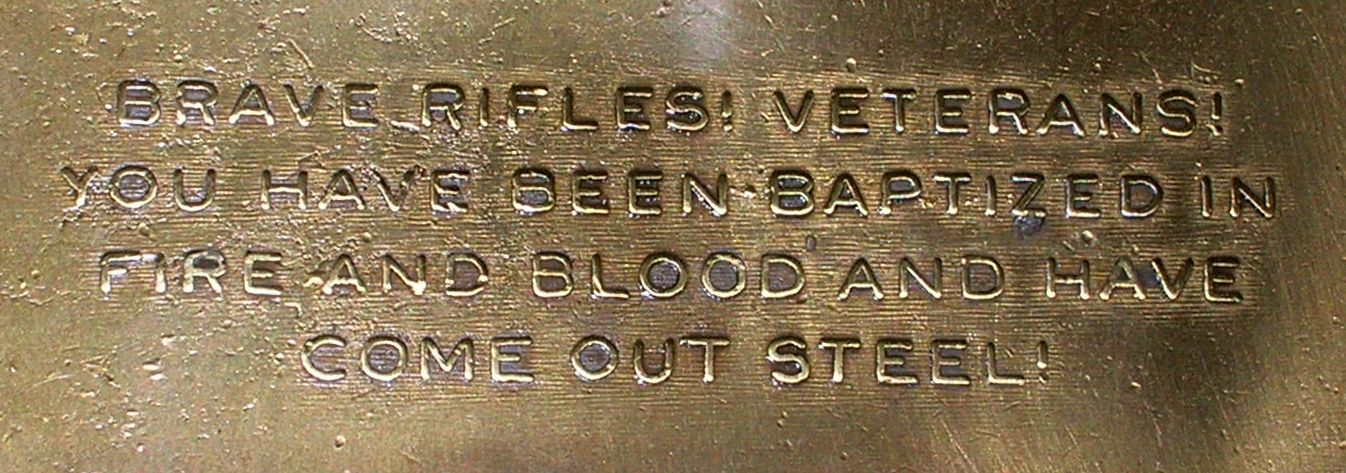
The regimental accolade

Originally formed to provide security for travelers on the Oregon Trail, the regiment was immediately rerouted southwards when the Mexican–American War began. The Mounted Riflemen lost most of their horses in a storm during the voyage across the Gulf of Mexico, forcing them to fight dismounted. Once the regiment landed at Veracruz on 9 March 1847, they would go on to serve in six campaigns of the Mexican War. On 17–18 April, the regiment was engaged in fierce hand-to-hand fighting during the Battle of Cerro Gordo and were soon engaged again in the Battle of Contreras on 19 August. On 20 August 1847, General Winfield Scott, Commander of American Forces in Mexico, made a speech from which the first sixteen words have become important to the regiment. The regiment was bloodied and exhausted from the fierce fighting at Contreras, but even so, each man stood at attention as Scott approached. The General removed his hat, bowed low, and said: "Brave Rifles! Veterans! You have been baptized in fire and blood and have come out steel!" This accolade is emblazoned on the regimental coat of arms, and is the source of the regimental motto, "Blood and Steel" and nickname, "Brave Rifles."

The Mounted Riflemen were soon after sent to engage in desperate fighting in the Battle of Churubusco later that day.

Today, all enlisted personnel are required to loudly challenge all officers in the 3rd Cavalry Regiment with the portion of the regimental accolade given to the Regiment of Mounted Riflemen during the Mexican–American War. When an enlisted trooper is preparing to render military courtesy upon contact with an officer he will yell out "Brave Rifles!" whereupon the officer will reply "Veterans!"

On 8 September 1847, as US forces continued the drive to Mexico City, intelligence was received that a cannon foundry and a large supply of gunpowder was believed to be at Molino del Rey, 1,000 yards east of Chapultepec Castle. MAJ Edwin V. Sumner took 270 Riflemen to screen the American flank as the attack on Molino del Rey began. 4,000 Mexican cavalrymen were poised to attack the US flank, but Sumner's men navigated a deep ravine (considered impassable by the Mexican cavalry), charged, and defeated the vastly superior force.

The climax to the regiment's participation in the Mexican War came on 13 September 1847 when the brigade the regiment belonged to was ordered to support the assault on the fortress of Chapultepec, the site of the Mexican National Military Academy. A pair of hand-picked, 250-man storming parties were formed, including a large number of Mounted Riflemen under CPT Benjamin S. Roberts. During the charge, a party of US Marines began to falter after their officers were lost, so LT Robert M. Morris of the regiment quickly took charge and led them to the top. While the fortress was being stormed, other elements of the regiment captured a Mexican artillery battery at the bottom of the castle. Leading the American forces, the regiment stormed into Mexico City at 1:20 pm. At 7:00 am on 14 September 1847, Sergeant James Manly of F Company and Captain Benjamin Roberts of C Company raised the National Colors over the National Palace while Captain Porter, commander of F Company, unfurled the regimental standard from the balcony.

For the remainder of the regiment's tenure in Mexico, they would conduct police duty and chase stubborn guerrillas. However, they also took part in the battles of Matamoros on 23 November 1847, Galaxara on 24 November, and Santa Fe on 4 January 1848. The Regiment of Mounted Riflemen earned a reputation among Army leaders as a brave and tough unit; General Winfield Scott said "Where bloody work was to be done, 'the Rifles' was the cry, and there they were. All speak of them in terms of praise and admiration."

During the Mexican War, 11 troopers were commissioned from the ranks and 19 officers received brevet promotions for gallantry in action. Regimental losses in Mexico were approximately 4 officers and 40 men killed, 13 officers and 180 wounded (many of whom would eventually die), and 1 officer and 180 men who died of other causes. The Rifles finally departed Mexico on 7 July 1848 and arrived in New Orleans on the 17th. Their ship, the Aleck Scott, sailed them up the Mississippi River back to Jefferson Barracks, Missouri.

=== Frontier duty ===
The regiment returned to Jefferson Barracks, Missouri, on 24 July 1848, where its veteran troopers were permitted to muster out, and new recruits were trained. On 10 May 1849, it began the grueling 2,000-mile (3,200 km) march to the Oregon Territory to accomplish the mission for which it was originally organized. Along the way, Companies C and E remained to garrison Fort Laramie and Companies B and F garrisoned Fort Hall on the Snake River. The remaining companies arrived at Oregon City in November 1849. In May 1851, The Mounted Riflemen were ordered to return to Jefferson Barracks. All the horses and Troopers were transferred to the 1st Dragoons in California, and the officers and NCOs traveled by ship to Panama. After crossing the Isthmus, they boarded another ship and returned to the regiment's birthplace, arriving on 16 July 1851. For the next six months, the regiment recruited, re-equipped, and re-trained.

In December 1851, the regiment was ordered to Texas. By January 1852, the regiment arrived at Fort Merrill, where for the next four years it operated against the Indian tribes living in the area. Patrols, skirmishes, guard, and escort duty were all part of the daily routine. In 1853, the regiment was redesignated as the First Regiment of Mounted Riflemen because the Army was considering raising another mounted rifle regiment. This did not happen, and the unit remained the only Regiment of Mounted Riflemen. J. E. B. Stuart served for a year in the regiment in 1854 as a Lieutenant after he graduated from the US Military Academy.

In 1856, Indian troubles in the New Mexico Territory required additional troops and the regiment moved further West. Fort Union became their home base, and the regiment's companies were spread out across a vast area stretching from Denver, Colorado, to the Mexico–United States border, and from West Texas to Nevada, Arizona, and Utah. In Texas, they were replaced by the newly created 2nd Cavalry Regiment (later designated the 5th Cavalry Regiment when the 2nd Dragoons were redesignated as the 2nd Cavalry). Service in New Mexico was constant and most exacting, and the various companies of the 1st Mounted Rifles were widely scattered and the number of troops available was wholly inadequate for the task of patrolling such a large area.

=== American Civil War ===
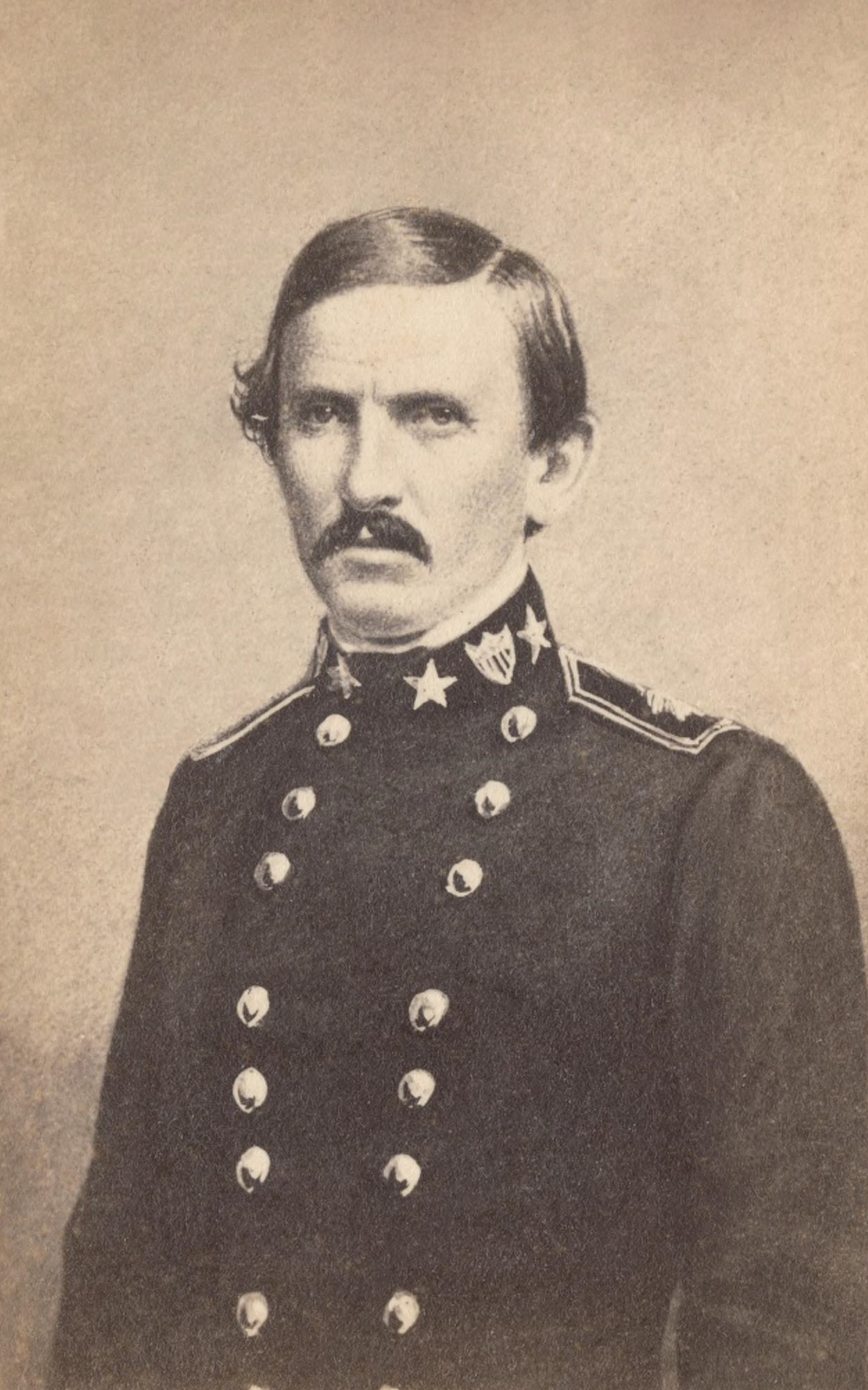
George B. Crittenden; the uniform style is of the Mexican–American War era

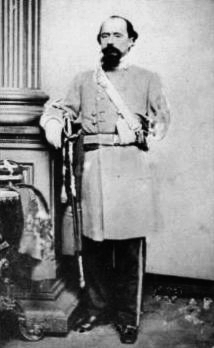
William W Loring, who lost an arm in the Mexican–American War with the Mounted Rifleman, seen here as a CSA General

In April 1861, the American Civil War broke out and 13 officers left the regiment to join the cause of the Confederacy, including future generals Joseph "Fighting Joe" Wheeler, William W. Loring, Dabney H. Maury, William H. Jackson, George B. Crittenden, and John G. Walker. Not a single enlisted man left the regiment.

At the outbreak of the war, a Confederate force of about 3,000 Texans began a campaign at Fort Bliss, Texas, to seize the territories of New Mexico and Colorado. The Regiment of Mounted Riflemen was one of the few Regular Army units in the region available to oppose them. On 25 July 1861, detachments of Companies B and F were involved in a hard fight at Mesilla under MAJ Isaac Lynde. Here, they charged the Confederate lines but were driven back after the attack faltered from accurate return fire, and the men retired to Fort Fillmore, where it was later surrendered on 26 July.

Prior to the Civil War, the US Army fielded five mounted regiments; the 1st Dragoons, 2d Dragoons, the Regiment of Mounted Riflemen, the 1st Cavalry, and the 2d Cavalry. On 3 August 1861, all mounted regiments of the U.S. Army were classified as "cavalry", and the Regiment of Mounted Riflemen was re-numbered the 3rd U.S. Cavalry Regiment, headquartered at Fort Thomas, third in precedence in the Regular Army.

1861 Cavalry Reorganization Act:

1st Dragoon Regiment re-designated 1st Cavalry Regiment

2d Dragoon Regiment re-designated 2d Cavalry Regiment

Regiment of Mounted Riflemen re-designated 3d Cavalry Regiment

1st Cavalry Regiment re-designated 4th Cavalry Regiment

2d Cavalry Regiment re-designated 5th Cavalry Regiment

Due to attrition, the regiment dwindled in size, and the troopers from Companies A, B, and H were transferred to other commands, leaving the 3rd Cavalry Regiment no larger than a battalion. Regardless, Companies C, G, and K defeated a Rebel cavalry unit near Fort Thorn, New Mexico, on 26 September 1861. On 21 February 1862, Companies C, D, G, I, and K under MAJ Thomas Duncan fought in the Battle of Valverde, the largest land battle of the Civil War west of the Mississippi River. The battle occurred at a strategically important ford across the Rio Grande north of Fort Craig, New Mexico. The Union forces, under General Edward Canby, attempted to hold off the Confederates under General Henry Hopkins Sibley but were outflanked. During the fighting, an officer from E Company, 3rd Cavalry, CPT Alexander McRae, commanded a battery of artillery and inflicted heavy damage upon the attacking enemy, but were eventually charged and destroyed. CPT McRae was from North Carolina, and was ostracized by his family for continuing to fight for the Union. During the battle, he and his provisional battery held off several waves of Confederate attacks until they were overrun. McRae was killed in the fighting, and Fort McRae, New Mexico, was named in his honor. He was one of two officers of the 3rd Cavalry Regiment killed in action in the Civil War.

After the Battle of Valverde, Companies C and K engaged in a fight with the Indians at Comanche Canyon while Company E was assisting with the evacuation of Albuquerque and Santa Fe through 4 March. On 26 March 1862, Company C was engaged at Apache Canyon by Confederate forces, this proved to be the opening skirmish of the Battle of Glorieta Pass. During this battle, the 3rd Cavalry troopers and other Union forces defeated the Confederates, and a unit of Colorado volunteers destroyed the enemy supply train, forcing them to abandon all ambitions of taking New Mexico or Colorado. As the Confederate forces retreated to Texas, they were pursued by the 3rd Cavalry, who caught up with them at Peralta. During this battle, Companies D, E, G, I, and K skirmished with the enemy and forced them to retreat, ending the New Mexico Campaign. E Company pursued the retreating Confederates all the way back to Texas until 22 April. Following this action, the regiment traveled to Jefferson Barracks on 23 November, then to Union occupied Memphis, Tennessee, in December, where it remained until October 1863.

Between October and December 1863, the 3d Cavalry participated in operations on the Memphis and Charleston Railroad and fought in skirmishes at various locations such as Barton Station, Cane Creek, and Dickinson's Station, Alabama. It was then tasked by General William T. Sherman to perform various reconnaissance missions as part of his army's advance guard. During the Knoxville Campaign, the regiment scouted and screened the advance of the relief expedition. Elements of the regiment also skirmished with Confederate units at Murphy, North Carolina and Loudon, Tennessee.

From May 1864 until the end of the war, the 3d Cavalry Regiment was stationed in Little Rock, Arkansas. Their duties included "preventing the organization of enemy commands, capturing guerrilla bands and escorting trains." During one patrol from Little Rock to Benton, Arkansas on 21 August 1864, the troopers were ambushed by Confederate guerrillas and forced to flee. The resulting confusion and rapid escape came to be known as the "Benton Races." When the Civil War ended, the 3d Cavalry remained in Little Rock until April 1866 during the Reconstruction Era. They had lost two officers and thirty enlisted men who were either killed in action or died of wounds and three officers and 105 enlisted men who died of disease or other non-combat causes.

=== Indian Wars ===
Company E, traveling on the Arkansas River, suffered 13 troopers killed, 9 injured, and 12 missing when the steamship Miami catastrophically exploded on 28 January 1866. In April 1866, Companies A, D, E, H, and L were sent to Carlisle Barracks, Pennsylvania to be brought back up to strength, and the regiment was once again ordered to the New Mexico territory to campaign against the Indians. In 1868–1869 many fights against Mescalero Apache, and also Jicarilla Apache, Navajo and Ute Indians involved detachments of the regiment between the Rio Grande and the Pecos River. On 9 July 1869, Companies G and I were attacked by a force of Navajo warriors near Fort Sumner, New Mexico. One soldier died from an arrow wound and four men were wounded severely enough to be dismounted from their horses. When the remainder of the unit retreated, these men were set upon and killed by the Indians. Five men were killed and four others were wounded. Beginning in February 1870, most of the companies of the 3rd Cavalry Regiment began moving individually to the Arizona Territory, but the regimental headquarters and Company I moved to Camp Halleck, and Company D to Camp McDermit, both in northern Nevada. Late in 1871, the regiment was transferred north to the Department of the Platte, which included what are now the states of Wyoming, Montana, North Dakota, South Dakota, and Nebraska. The 3rd Cavalry became the main cavalry force for department operations in the Black Hills region.

During the summer of 1876, the regiment participated in the Little Big Horn Campaign against the Sioux and Cheyenne. On 17 March, elements of the 3d Cavalry fought alongside the 2d Cavalry Regiment at the Battle of Powder River. During this fierce engagement, PVT Lorenzo E. Meyers of M Company was wounded, and saddler Jeremiah J. Murphy of F Company and blacksmith Albert Glawinski of M Company attempted to rescue him. The wounded man was cut limb from limb by the vengeful Indians, but Murphy and Glawinski were awarded the Medal of Honor for their gallant rescue attempt. US forces were forced to withdraw after frostbite crippled their ranks; 66 troopers suffered from this condition. The 3d Cavalry sustained three men killed and one wounded in this battle. On 17 June 1876, ten companies of the 3rd Cavalry fought in the Battle of Rosebud Creek. This was the largest battle between the Army and the Indians in the history of the American West, with 1,400 friendly Indians and troopers opposing more than 1,500 hostile Indians. Despite the US forces being stymied by the Indians, during the battle, "three battalions of the 3d Cavalry under Captains Mills, Henry and Van Vliet, performed gallant, heroic, and outstanding service. " CPT Henry was shot in the face, lost an eye, and eventually became the 12th colonel of the regiment. Four 3rd Cavalry troopers received the Medal of Honor for bravery in this battle. Their names were: Trumpeter Elmer A. Snow of Company M, 1SG Joseph Robinson of Company D, 1SG Michael A. McGann of Company F, and 1SG John H. Shingle of Company I.

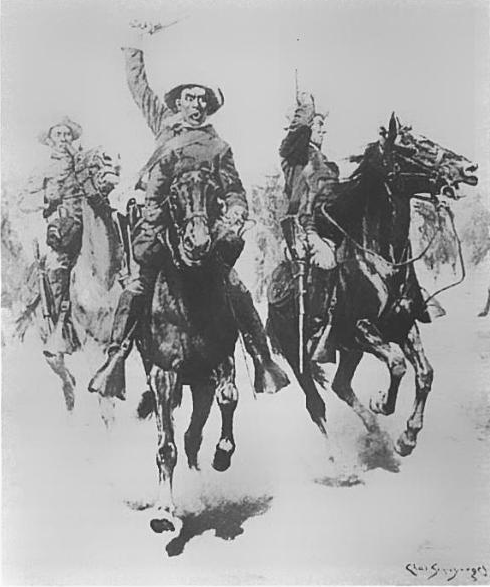
Lt. Schwatka's charge at Slim Buttes

After General Custer's infamous defeat at the Battle of Little Bighorn, General Crook led an expedition to punish the perpetrators of the massacre. Assembling a force of infantry, cavalry, and native scouts, Crook set out without bringing enough rations. Thus began one of the darkest chapters of 3d Cavalry history; the Horsemeat March. Cavalrymen were forced to eat their slain mounts, their shoes, and anything else they could get their hands on. The march came to end near Slim Buttes, South Dakota. Here the troopers caught up with the Sioux and defeated them soundly. Under CPT Anson Mills, the 3d Cavalry launched an attack on Chief American Horse's village, LT Frederick Schwatka led a charge to scatter the Indians' horses and LT Emmet Crawford set up a skirmish line and engaged the enemy at range. When the battle was won, the village was ransacked, and the troopers got their first real food since they departed. On 25 November 1876, Companies H and K fought alongside elements of the 2nd, 4th, and 5th Cavalry Regiments in the Dull Knife Fight. Chief Dull Knife offered stiff resistance, but was defeated and his village was ransacked by the cavalry. After this battle, the 3d Cavalry continued patrolling and keeping peace on the western frontier until trouble brewed in Arizona.

With the Apache uprising in the spring of 1882, the regiment was ordered to return to Arizona, and on 17 July, the 3d and 6th Cavalry Regiments defeated renegade Apaches in the Battle of Big Dry Wash. This battle quelled the last Apache uprising in Arizona and also marked the end of the regiment's participation in the Indian Wars. This action resulted in the award of two more Medals of Honor, to 1SG Charles Taylor of Company D and Lieutenant George H. Morgan of Company K.

The year 1883 would see the term company changed to troop in the mounted service and in 1885 the red and white guidon replaced the 1863 stars and stripes pattern adopted at the beginning of the Civil War.

In 1885, the regiment was ordered back to Texas, where it remained until 1893. Between 1893 and 1897, the 3d Cavalry traveled around the USA engaging in garrison, training, and ceremonial duties in the East and Midwest. In July 1897, the Regimental Headquarters and four troops were stationed at Fort Ethan Allen, Vermont, and the rest returned to Jefferson Barracks, Missouri.

During the Indian Wars the regiment adopted its second motto "Ai-ee-yah," the Sioux word for "Attack".

=== Spanish–American War ===
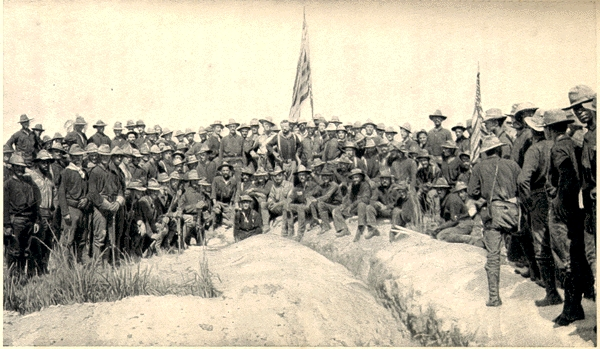
Original title: "Colonel Roosevelt and his Rough Riders at the top of the hill which they captured, Battle of San Juan Hill." Left to right is 3rd US Cavalry, 1st Volunteer Cavalry (Col. Theodore Roosevelt center) and 10th US Cavalry.

In April 1898, the regiment was assembled at Camp George H. Thomas in Chickamauga National Park and assigned to a brigade in a provisional cavalry division when the Spanish–American War erupted.

On 13 May 1898, the regiment arrived in Tampa, Florida. On 8 June, the regiment, minus four troops, embarked, dismounted, on the transport Rio Grande for Cuba. Three provisional squadrons were formed; 2nd Squadron was commanded by MAJ Henry W. Wessels Jr. and consisted of Troops C, E, F, and G. 3rd Squadron, under CPT Charles Morton, consisted of Troops B, H, I, and K. The four troops that were left in camp (Troops A, D, L, and M) in Tampa took care of the animals and regimental property and instructed recruits. The regiment landed at Daiquirí, Cuba but were forced to leave behind most of their horses.

One of the Army's objectives was to seize the Spanish positions on the high ground around the landward side of the city of Santiago de Cuba, a Cuban seaport. This would force the Spanish warships in the harbor to sail out to face the U.S. Navy. The cavalry division, of which the regiment was a part, was one of three divisions assigned the mission of assaulting these hills, known as the San Juan Heights. The 3d Cavalry was one of five regular U.S. cavalry regiments engaged there.

Three troops of 3rd Squadron crossed over Kettle Hill and on to the Spanish positions around what was known as the San Juan Hill. Despite a lack of water, the men charged the fortified Spanish positions on foot. Despite being forced to advance uphill and across a river, the troopers' movements were partially screened by the dense foliage. SGT Andrews, carrying the regimental standard, fell from a bullet wound, but it was quickly recovered and the advance resumed. Troop B advanced to the enemy's line at the San Juan Blockhouse (different from the San Juan House) where the regiment's U.S. Flag, carried by Sergeant Bartholomew Mulhern of Troop E, was the first to be raised at the point of victory. 2nd Squadron, held in reserve on Kettle Hill, joined the 3rd Squadron on San Juan Hill that evening. On 23 July, 1LT John W. Heard, the regimental quartermaster, was directing several troopers unloading supplies from the Wanderer near Bahia Honda when they were set upon by a force of 1,000 Spanish cavalrymen. After two men were shot and the ship was disabled, Heard led the defense and repelled the enemy attack. For this action, he would receive the Medal of Honor. The regiment stayed in Cuba until 6 and 7 August 1898 when they sailed for Montauk Point, New York.

The 3d Cavalry's casualties were three Troopers killed, six officers and forty-six Troopers wounded. 1LT John W. Heard, Regimental Quartermaster, was awarded a Medal of Honor for most distinguished gallantry in action and Certificates of Merit were awarded to five Troopers. These certificates were the forerunner of the Silver Star Medal. The 3d Cavalry did not remain together for very long. In February and March 1899, two troops were assigned to Fort Sheridan, Illinois, two troops to Jefferson Barracks, four troops and the band to Fort Myer, Virginia, while the remainder of the regiment stayed at Fort Ethan Allen. Because of the unit's participation in the attack on San Juan Hill (of which former president Theodore Roosevelt was a famous participant), Tiger Squadron's Headquarters and Headquarters Troop (HHT) was named "Roughrider," in honor of Roosevelt's Roughriders, and even adopted an image of Teddy Roosevelt riding on a steed in modern body armor as their logo.

==== Old Bill ====
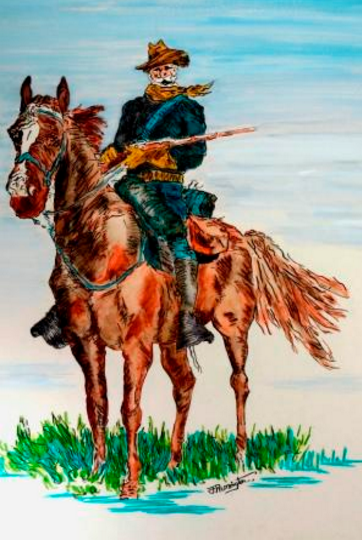
Old Bill by Frederic Remington in Cuba, 1898. Unofficial mascot of the 3rd US Cavalry.

In 1898, the American artist Frederic Remington was visiting the camp of the 3d U.S. Cavalry in Tampa, Florida, where the regiment was preparing for the invasion of Cuba during the Spanish–American War. During his visit, Remington's attention was drawn to one of the troop's NCOs. Sergeant John Lannen struck the artist as the epitome of the cavalryman and he made several rough sketches of Lannen. From those rough sketches Remington later executed the now famous drawing portraying a trooper astride his mount with a carbine cradled in his arm, depicted here. At some point in the past this drawing became known as Old Bill. This drawing represents a trooper, a unit, and a branch of service and has come to symbolize mobile operations in the US Army. Unfortunately, SGT Lannen contracted yellow fever, as did so many other Americans in the war, and died in Santiago after almost 30 years of national service. Additionally, the 3d Cavalry Regiment's Headquarters and Headquarters Troop, Remington Troop, was named after the artist of this piece, thereby deepening the historical connection within the regiment.

=== Philippine–American War ===
When the United States defeated Spain in the Spanish–American War, 400 years of Spanish rule in Cuba, Puerto Rico, Guam, and the Philippine Islands came to an end. The United States, as a new world power, saw the Philippines as the perfect location for a naval facility to support a new Pacific fleet. 3rd Cavalry units had barely arrived at their new duty stations in the U.S. when, on 22 July 1899, the regimental headquarters and Troops A, C, D, E, F, K, L, and M were ordered to Seattle, Washington. From Seattle, this force embarked for the Philippine Islands to operate against the insurgents who were trying to prevent the United States from taking control. Meanwhile, Troops B, G, H, and I were ordered to assemble at Fort Myer.

The deploying troops landed in Manila in October 1899, with the remaining four troops following from Fort Myers in 1900. The 3d Cavalry remained on the island of Luzon until 1902, fighting sixty-two engagements during that time. The fighting was often fierce with no quarter asked and none given. This would be the first time the U.S. Army would fight in a jungle environment, and the first time it would fight a counterinsurgency, but it would not be the last. The regiment returned to the United States in detachments between April and November 1902. The Headquarters, band, and Troops A, D, I, K, L, and M were stationed in Montana, Troops B and C in Wyoming, Troops G and H in Arizona, Troop E in Idaho and Troop F in North Dakota.

The 3d Cavalry Regiment remained in the United States until December 1905, when it was again ordered to the Philippines for peacetime occupation duty. It remained there until 1908, when it was ordered home and stationed in Texas. The following nine years were spent in garrison and patrolling the Mexican border. On 21 Oct 1915, ten men of Troop G made up half a U.S. garrison in the last of the United States/Mexican Border raids at Ojo de Agua Raid.

=== World War I ===
On 17 March 1917, the entire 3d Cavalry Regiment was transferred to Fort Sam Houston, Texas, and one month later, the United States of America entered the First World War on the side of the Allies. The regiment was one of the first units to arrive in France in November of that year, and immediately began their duties; the operation of three major horse remount depots. The three squadrons were charged with the purchase of horses, mules and forage, the care, conditioning, and training of remounts before issue, and the distribution and issue of remounts to the American Expeditionary Force. The only 3d Cavalry unit to see action in World War I was K Troop, detached from 3d Squadron, the Troop served in I Corps during the Aisne-Marne Offensive (18 July – 6 August 1918), and in III Corps on the Vesle Front (7-17 August), the Oise-Aisne Offensive (18 August – 9 September), and the Meuse-Argonne Offensive (14 September – 11 November).

Troop K also served as part of the Army of Occupation. The occupation forces' first order of business was to continue training and to be prepared to implement a contingency plan in case Germany refused to sign the armistice or hostilities were resumed. Troop K participated in the March to the Rhine and served in the American Sector of the Army of Occupation from 15 November 1918 – 1 July 1919, when it prepared to sail home. After the Armistice, the regiment was ordered to sell the remaining animals to French civilians. 345,580 animals were sold, and $52,000,000 was recovered for the Army. The 3d Cavalry Regiment departed Brest, France and arrived home in Boston, Massachusetts on the Fourth of July, 1919.

=== Interwar period ===
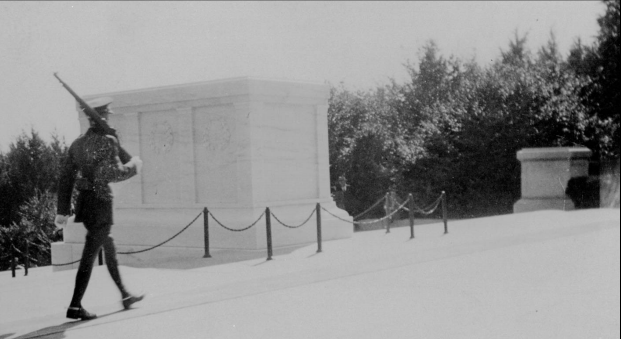
A member of the 2nd Squadron of the Regiment of Mounted Riflemen guards the Tomb of the Unknown Soldier at Arlington National Cemetery, one of many ceremonial duties undertaken by the Brave Rifles in the period between World War I and World War II. Note the spurs.

3d Cavalry Regiment were also involved in the so-called Red Summer of 1919.

Upon arrival in the US, Headquarters was moved to Fort Ethan Allen, Vermont, and 3rd Squadron was stationed in Fort Myer, Virginia. 2nd Squadron, along with Troops A and C were inactivated, and 3rd Squadron was redesignated as the 2nd Squadron. Because 2nd Squadron's posting was so close to Washington D.C. and Arlington National Cemetery, the troopers were frequently called upon to serve as honor guards and escorts for distinguished visitors, and as funeral escorts for distinguished citizens and military personnel. 2/3 Cavalry became known as the "President's Own" because of these duties. On 11 November 1921, the 3d Cavalry Regiment provided the cavalry escort for the interment of the Unknown Soldier and the dedication of the Tomb of the Unknowns in Arlington National Cemetery. SSG Frank Witchey, the regimental bugler, sounded Taps at the ceremony, and this bugle and tabard are on display in the regimental museum in Fort Hood, Texas. The 3d Cavalry provided the Tomb's honor guard until 1941. During this period, the regiment became well known throughout the Eastern USA for its horse shows and stunt-riding teams.

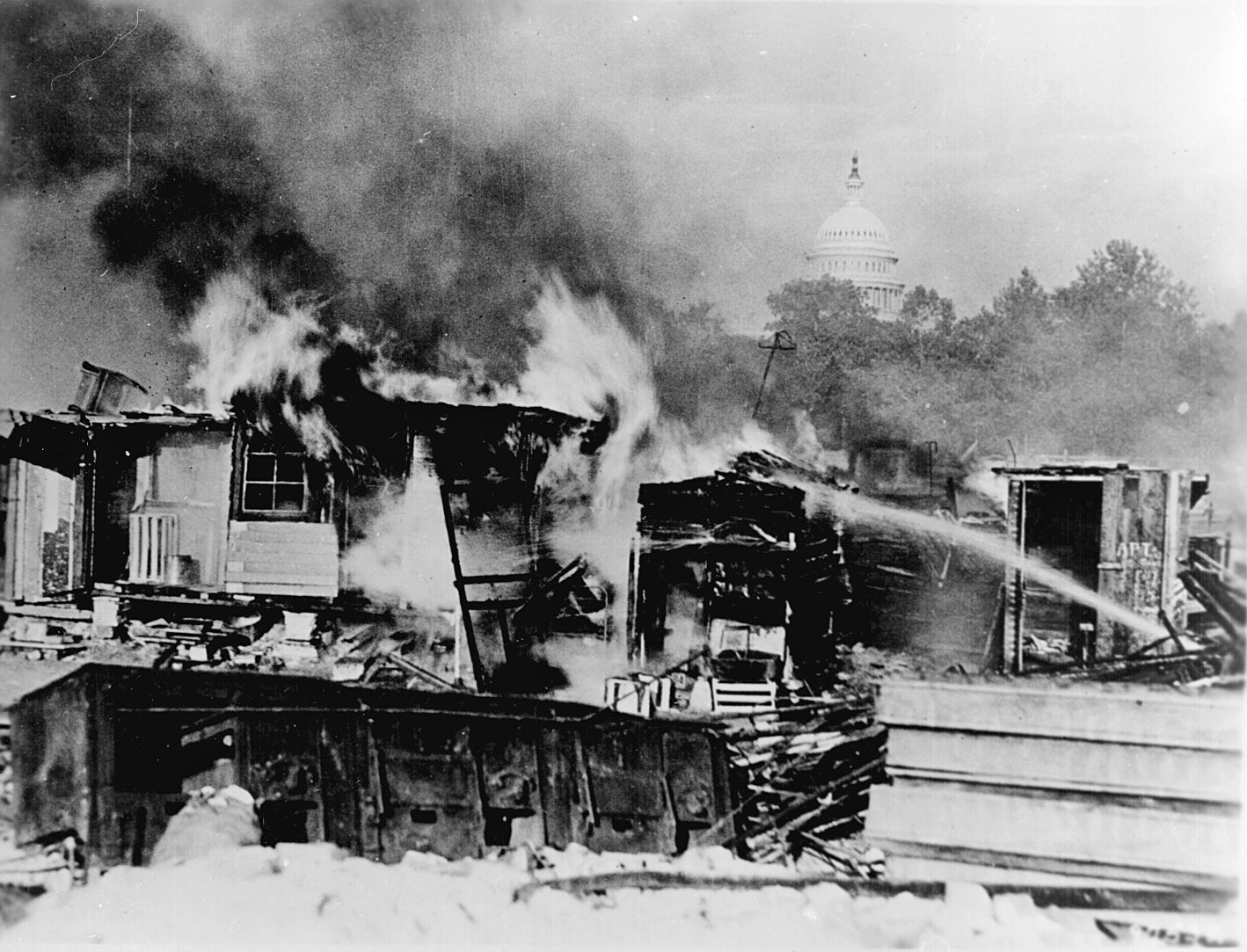
Bonus Army camp burns within sight of the Capitol.

In July 1932, MAJ George S. Patton was made the executive officer of the 3d Cavalry, which was ordered to Washington by Army Chief of Staff, General Douglas MacArthur. Patton took command of the 600 troops of the 3d Cavalry, and on 28 July, MacArthur ordered Patton's troops to advance on protesting veterans known as the "Bonus Army" with tear gas and bayonets. Patton was dissatisfied with MacArthur's conduct, as he recognized the legitimacy of the veterans' complaints and had himself earlier refused to issue the order to employ armed force to disperse the veterans. Patton later stated that, though he found the duty "most distasteful", he also felt that putting the marchers down prevented an insurrection and saved lives and property. He personally led the 3d Cavalry down Pennsylvania Avenue, dispersing the protesters.

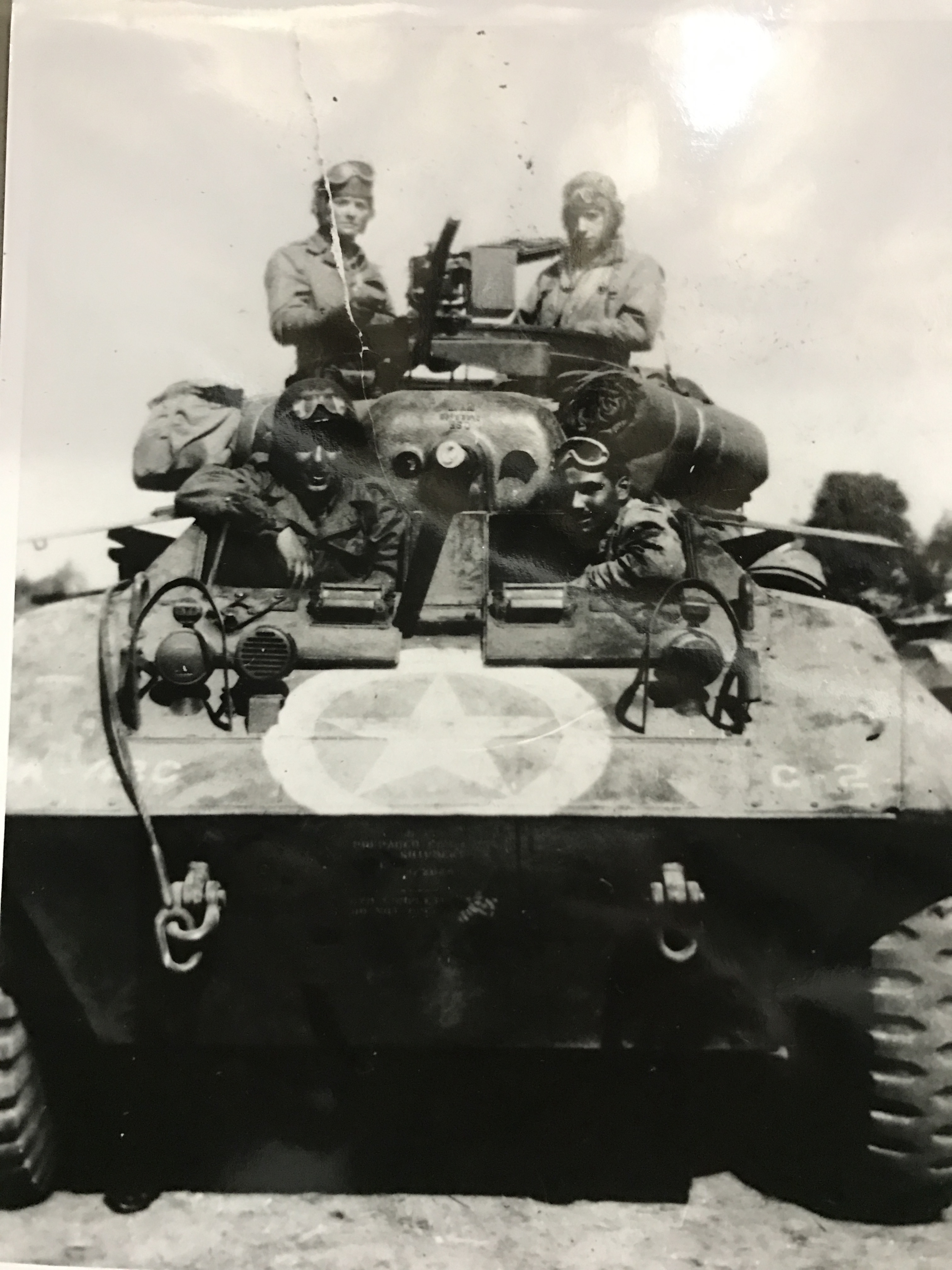
M8 Greyhound and Crew of C Troop, 43rd Reconnaissance Squadron, part of the 3rd Cavalry Group during WWII

=== World War II ===
When the United States entered World War II after the Attack on Pearl Harbor on 7 December 1941, the 3d Cavalry was still a horse-mounted unit in an age of mechanized warfare. 21 February 1942 marked the end of an era as the troopers turned in their horses for armored vehicles. They began their training at Fort Benning, Georgia and in January 1943, the regiment was reorganized as follows; the 3d Cavalry Regiment was redesignated the 3d Mechanized Cavalry Group (MCG), 1st Squadron became the 3d Cavalry Reconnaissance Squadron, and 2nd Squadron became the 43rd Cavalry Reconnaissance Squadron. At Camp Gordon, Georgia the Group began conducting mechanized operations and participated in combined arms maneuvers in Tennessee and Fort Jackson, South Carolina before sailing to England.

Arriving in England in June 1944, the 3d MCG began preparing for combat in France. They landed in Normandy on 9 August and were assigned to be the covering force of XX Corps of Patton's Third Army. While conducting screening, reconnaissance, and covering missions, the 3d MCG was the first unit of the Third Army to reach the Meuse River and the Moselle River, and were also the first to enter the city of Thionville. On 31 August 1944, the 1st Platoon of B Troop, 3rd Cavalry Reconnaissance Squadron, with 30 men, 6 Jeeps armed with .50 cal MG, and three M-8 armored cars with 37 mm guns made a raid behind enemy lines to Thionville, France, in a desperate attempt to prevent the bridge across the Moselle from being destroyed by the Germans.

The platoon conducted the raid 75 miles (121 km) behind enemy lines as US Forces advanced slowly towards the Moselle River to effect a crossing on its push toward the German "West Wall". Troop commander Captain James D. Jackson succeeded in crossing the river to the eastern approach to the bridge and cut the wires leading to the demolition charges, and was wounded in the attempt. An enemy sniper then killed Sgt. T Baker when he assumed command, at that time Pvt. Lawrence Webb manned the .50 cal machine gun atop one of the Jeeps and fired upon the sniper until he was wounded himself. Sgt. Baker was the only fatality among the raiders.

Their mission accomplished, the platoon crossed the dynamite-laden bridge to rescue Jackson before falling back, fighting their way out. In so doing, they were no doubt the first American troops to cross the Moselle in WWII. The platoon suffered 6 casualties and 2 Jeeps lost. Captain Jackson was awarded the Distinguished Service Cross, and the bridge over the Moselle was temporarily saved from destruction. The remainder of the Army did not reach and cross the Moselle until 12 September at Arnaville, France.

On 3 November 1944, the 135th Engineer Combat Battalion, the 705th Tank Destroyer Battalion, and the 40th Field Artillery Group were attached to the unit. Because of these attachments, the 3d MCG was renamed "Task Force Polk" after COL James H. Polk, the 32nd colonel of the regiment. Task Force Polk grew and shrunk throughout the war, and its max strength was roughly 5,000 men when the 5th Ranger Battalion was attached as well. On 17 November, TF Polk crossed the Moselle and possibly became the first US troops to enter Germany. Covering the advance of the 10th Armored Division, TF Polk was heavily engaged in the Battle of Metz, where it fought dismounted in fierce urban combat.

During the Battle of the Bulge, cavalrymen held their positions and conducted active defensive operations around the Moselle River, and maintaining contact with other US units. Probing German defenses and dissipating minor German thrusts along the line ensured more American troops were not needlessly pulled away from the fighting around Bastogne. Once the German counteroffensive had been stymied, TF Polk began its move to the Siegfried Line and the Rhine River. Crossing the Rhine on 29 March 1945, the troopers made a three-day dash over 150 miles to capture Bad Hersfeld, north of Fulda. In April and early May 1945, with the end in sight, TF Polk was sent south into Upper Austria to link up with elements of the Red Army.

On 5 May 1945, the 3d Cavalry Reconnaissance Squadron entered the small village of Ebensee, Austria and came face to face with the Nazi's "Final Solution". KZ Ebensee on the edge of the town contained about 16,000 prisoners, who had not been fed for about 3 days and who were dying at the rate of 400 per day. First on the scene, the squadron's first priority shifted from combat to care for the prisoners. The town's bakeries were put on round-the clock baking status. Bakers, who at first refused, found an M-8 or Sherman gun muzzle pointed into their shop.

The squadron remained in the area caring for the prisoners until medical units relieved them. After VE Day, the troopers were ordered to cross the Alps into Northern Italy to keep an eye on the various factions vying for power in postwar Yugoslavia, but returned to Austria shortly afterwards. During the Second World War, the 3rd MCG (TF Polk included) moved 3,000 miles in 265 days (117 days of continuous combat without rest), and accounted for 43,000 enemy killed, wounded, and captured. The 3rd Squadron returned stateside to a 30-day furlough before reporting to Fort Bragg to begin training for "Operation Downfall" – the invasion of the Japanese home islands. Their training was canceled when Japan surrendered on 14 August 1945.

=== Cold War ===
After the war the regiment was posted to Fort George G. Meade. During this time troopers of the regiment were filmed at Ft. Meade for sequences in the science fiction film The Day the Earth Stood Still in 1950. The first time the 3d Cavalry served on the Iron Curtain was in August 1955, when it replaced the 2d Cavalry as part of the Army's Gyroscope plan that rotated entire units between Germany and the U.S. In February 1958, the cycle repeated and the troopers of the 3d Cavalry returned to the States as the 2d Cavalry resumed their former mission. The 3d Cavalry, though, would not remain stateside for long.

When 3d Cavalry returned to the United States from Germany in February 1958, and was once again stationed at Fort Meade. The regiment became part of the Strategic Army Corps (STRAC) and, from 1958 to 1961, it was the recipient of four STRAC streamers, awarded for superior readiness and training.

By the mid-1950s the United States Army was developing a way to continue to modernize the force without constantly creating new regiments and de-activating older ones as their unit type/function was no longer needed. The driving force behind this was the realization at the end of World War II that many units in the Total Army did not have any lineage or ties to the history of the Army prior to World War I. Up until that time, new units had constantly been created and inactivated both as technology changed and the Army did its accordion-like swelling and shrinking as a result of conflicts and peace. Together, these factors resulted in regiments with broken histories as they bore no links to any that existed prior and the great deeds of regiments in prior wars were not captured in the lineage of the current regiments, other than the few Active-Duty Regiments of the Infantry, Field Artillery, and Cavalry that had stood the test of time. The Army Chiefs also wished to create a more modular force that could modernize and change equipment without completely breaking the tables of organization that the regiments used; they desired to be able to create battalions with different weapon systems all within the same regimental headquarters or a brigade. The brigade was preferred as the higher headquarters de to them being traditionally provisionary unlike the regiments which were tied to the tables of organization.

In 1957, the Army settled on the system that would become the Combat Arms Regimental System (CARS) and later the United States Regimental System (USARS). Under CARS, all but a few combat arms regiments would be re-organized in order to create more modular and easily modernized battalions. To keep these "new" battalions tied to the lineage and honors of their parent regiment, the regimental headquarters were brought to zero manning and brought directly under the control of the Department of the Army; thus, their lineages would continue since they are still active units. Next, the battalion HQs and company/battery/troops of the original regiment were re-organized and re-designated as the headquarters and headquarters company/battery/troop of the new battalion. This allowed the new battalions to carry on the lineage of the regiment through their founding company/battery/troop. For example, Troop A, 1st Cavalry Regiment was re-organized and re-designated as Headquarters and Headquarters Troop, 1st Squadron - 1st Cavalry Regiment, and so on. This reorganization of the regiments allowed the new battalions to each have a different weapon system and mission set while still being able to trace their lineage to the history of the Army.

Several combat arms regiments were left out of being organized under CARS; these were the 75th Ranger Regiments and the Armored Cavalry Regiments (2d, 3d, 11th, and 14th). The ACRs were left as functioning administrative and tactical headquarters but with the units the size of a brigade. This was partially because the ACRs continued to fill the roles of the traditional cavalry as the covering and reconnaissance force for corps and field armies and partially because to be organized under CARS, those regiments would have to be turned into brigade headquarters causing new non-divisional brigades to be created, which would defeat the purpose of maintaining the Army's history.

In the 1980s, the Army adopted the United States Army Regimental System (USARS) to replace CARS. USARS brought the service support branches into the CARS concept by creating a whole of branch concept for the lineage of the service support branches. Their branch headquarters serves as the 'Regimental Headquarters' of that branch. This was done in order for every Officer and Soldier in the Army to affiliate with a Regiment with whom they had honorably served six months.

In November 1961, the regiment was deployed to Germany once again in response to the Soviet threat during the Berlin Crisis. The troopers were stationed in Kaiserslautern but the unit soon found itself once again patrolling the border. Cavalry Troops within the regiment were soon attached on a monthly, rotating basis to the 14th Armored Cavalry Regiment to assist with patrols in the 3/14 ACR sector. Additionally, the 1st and 2nd Squadrons relieved units of the 14th Cavalry for two one-month periods during 1962 and 1963. During 1964, though, the regiment played a larger role in border operations.

Since the 11th Cavalry was scheduled to return to the U.S. in the summer of 1964, a unit was needed to fill the gap along the Iron Curtain in southeastern Bavaria. To meet this requirement, the 2nd Squadron, 3d Cavalry, was re-designated as the 1st Squadron, 11 ACR, and rotated back to the states with the 11th Cavalry. At the same time, the 11th Cavalry's 1st Squadron stationed in Straubing was re-designated as 2nd Squadron, 3d Cavalry, and conducted border operations under the regimental colors of the 3rd Armored Cavalry Regiment. The unit conducted border operations from its two border camps until March 1965 when it was relieved by 2/9th Cavalry of the 24th Infantry Division. The regiment remained in Germany until July 1968 when it moved to Fort Lewis, Washington. The 3rd Armored Cavalry regiment participated in the Return of Forces to Germany (REFORGER) exercise 1 during 1968 and REFORGER 2 during July and August 1971.

In July 1972, the 3rd Cavalry received orders to move to Fort Bliss, Texas, and subsequently participated in REFORGERs during 1975, 1977, 1978, 1982, 1983, and 1988.

Lucky 16

In 1979, during the height of the Cold War, both the 2d and 11th Cavalry Regiments were stationed along the Iron Curtain on the German border. During this time, the two Cavalry Regiments joined as one brotherhood called the "Lucky 13." This title stands for the good fortune that cavalrymen, past and present, enjoy by serving among this Nation's elite combat units and the numeric summation of the two Regiments represented. Only three years later, when the 3d Cavalry Regiment deployed to Europe for the REFORGER 1982 exercise, it formally joined its brother Regiments, thereby creating the "Lucky 16" (2+3+11). Since then, whenever the missions of two or more of the Regiments coincide in the same location, the Lucky 16 convenes, conducting professional exchanges and celebrating the great history of the Cavalry.

Two decades after the organization's founding, when the 278th Cavalry (Tennessee Army National Guard) deployed to NTC for Rotation 02–09, the brotherhood of Lucky 16 bestowed honorary member status upon our Army's only National Guard Regiment, formally unifying the four Armored Cavalry Regiments serving the Nation. Because the 11th Armored Cavalry Regiment resides in Fort Irwin as and helps train units that pass through the National Training Center and the 2d Cavalry Regiment remains forward deployed in Vilseck, Germany, the majority of Lucky 16 gatherings take place whenever the 3d Cavalry Regiment conducts a rotation at NTC. Nevertheless, whenever two of the Regiments meet, the third is required to send a representative, so the tradition never fades. The Lucky 16 formally convened in combat for the first, and only time, on 28 September 2008 when representatives from each Regiment presided over a signing of the Lucky 16 Preamble at COB Speicher in Tikrit, Iraq.

=== Gulf War ===
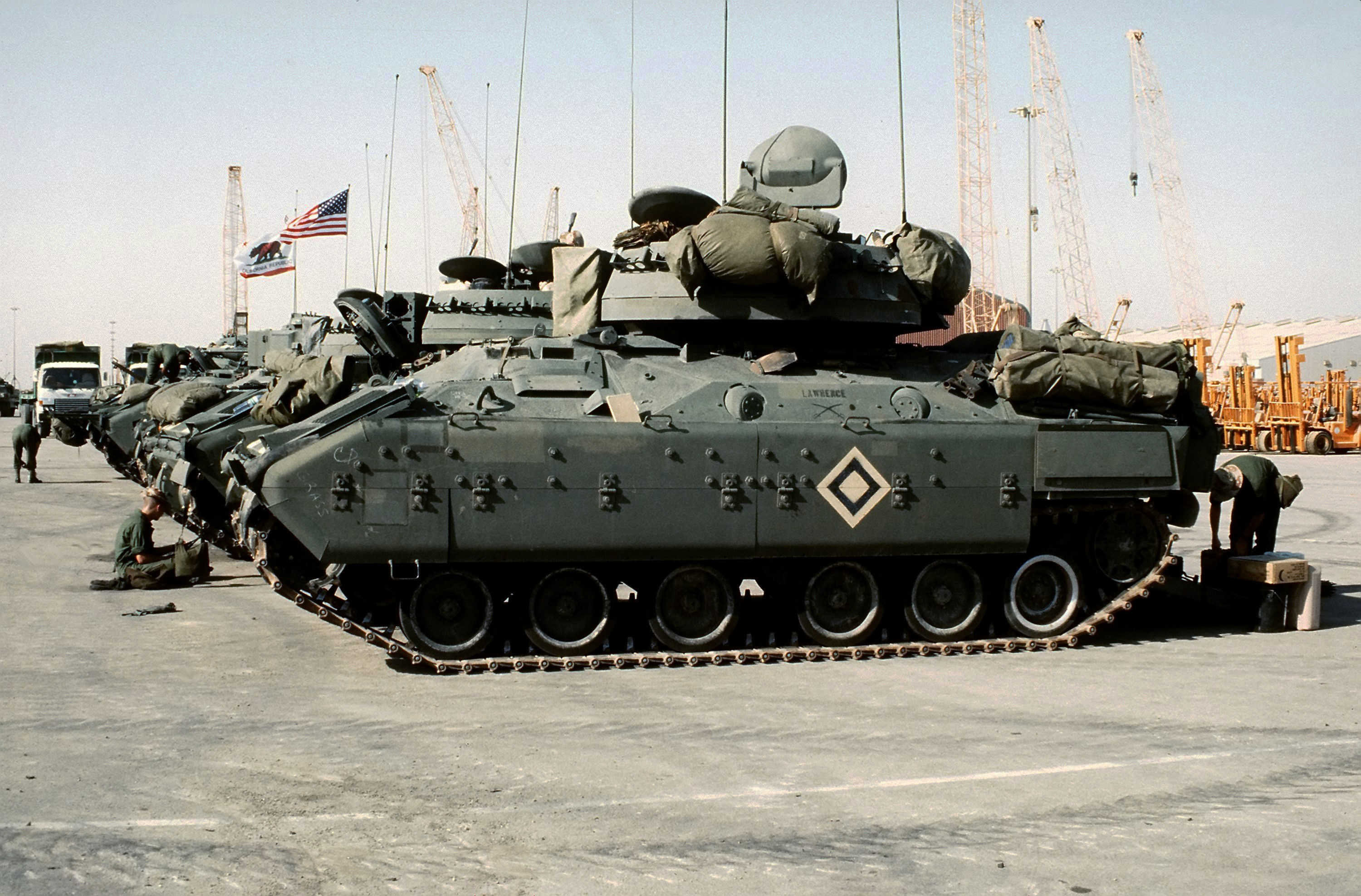
M-3 Bradleys of L Troop, 3d ACR, stand in line at a holding area during Operation Desert Shield.

On 7 August 1990, the regiment was alerted to move overseas in defense of Saudi Arabia. In September 1990, the regiment arrived in country as part of the XVIII Airborne Corps, and moved into defensive positions north of the TAPLINE Road near the town of Al-Nairiyah. The regiment served as covering force for the Corps' defense of Saudi Arabia during DESERT SHIELD. See the Order of battle of the Gulf War ground campaign for other units in the Corps. During deployment of the 2d Cavalry Regiment from Germany to Saudi Arabia in December 1990, the 3d Cavalry's officers hosted their counterparts from the 2d Cavalry in the traditional "Lucky" conference, this one known as a "Lucky 5."

In January 1991, the regiment moved to the west as part of the Coalition Forces "left hook" maneuver and took up positions along the Iraqi border in the area known as the Neutral Zone. On 22 January 1991, elements of I Troop led by the 63rd Colonel, Colonel Douglas Starr, engaged in the first ground combat of the XVIII Airborne Corps. The regiment's attack was successful in destroying an Iraqi Army outpost. On 24 February 1991, the 2nd "Sabre" Squadron led the regiment across the berm into Iraq. In 100 hours, the regiment moved over 300 kilometers, and left remnants of three Iraqi Republican Guard divisions in its wake. The regiment was task organized with over 7,000 soldiers for Desert Storm. The former regimental deputy commander, 2007–2009 LTC(R) Nathan E. Hines III, was the regimental scout platoon leader during the assault into Iraq. At the time of OIF 07-09 he was one of only three soldiers in the 5,000 soldier regiment who served with them in Operation Desert Storm.

The regiment deployed back to the U.S., arriving 5 April 1991. The regiment fielded new combat systems and conducted the first National Training Center rotation for a combat proven unit. The regiment deployed to NTC 11–91 and defeated the OPFOR during regimental force on force operations; the culmination battle for the rotation. In the fall of 1995, the 3d ACR began its relocation to Fort Carson with the regiment fully standing up in the Spring of 1996 (the 4th Infantry Division was relocated from Fort Carson to Fort Hood).

Four years after the return from Operation Desert Storm in April 1996, the regiment completed its move to its new home at Fort Carson, Colorado. During this historic period the regiment was led by COL Douglas Starr, 63rd Colonel of the Regiment; COL Robert Ivany, 64th Colonel of the Regiment; COL Robert Young, 65th Colonel of the Regiment; COL Robert Wilson, 66th Colonel of the Regiment; and COL Martin Dempsey, 67th Colonel of the Regiment.

=== Bosnia peacekeeping ===
In August 1998, the regiment was notified that it would participate in the Bosnian peace-keeping mission as part of Stabilization Force 7 (SFOR 7). This would be a unique deployment because the 3d Armored Cavalry Regiment (minus 1st Squadron), would be under the operational control of the Texas National Guard's 49th Armored Division. SFOR 7 was the first time that a National Guard organization would have command authority overactive component units as well as a multinational force, known as Task Force Eagle. 3rd ACR troopers had to stand down from a more aggressive war-fighting posture to act as neutral observers. They trained at Brcko, a simulated Bosnian village built by Fort Carson to provide a realistic training environment. After taking part in sustained training exercises conducted by other units stationed at Ft. Carson, those members of the regiment slated for the deployment completed a rigorous exercise at Ft. Polk, Louisiana designed to test their readiness for the SFOR mission. While the SFOR units were to be involved in the peacekeeping operations in Bosnia, Task Force Rifles (TFR) was activated back at Fort Carson. Composed of Tiger Squadron and all regimental units remaining at Fort Carson, TFR was tasked with post red cycle duties as well as maintaining the many vehicles that were not taken to Bosnia.

When the 3d Armored Cavalry Regiment deployed, beginning in February 2000, it represented 75% of the American contribution to the Multinational Division North (MND-N) and constituted the bulk of the American maneuver element. The Troopers of Sabre Squadron helped facilitate the elections that began a new era of democracy for the Bosnian state. There were no major incidents or violent demonstrations in their area of responsibility during the six-month deployment. Thunder Squadron occupied Camp Dobol and its area of responsibility on 27 March 2000. Thunder Squadron Troopers provided security for more than 3,000 Bosnian widows and mourners who returned to the Serb-dominated town of Potočari.

For the first time, a U.S. Army artillery unit conducted patrols as part of the peacekeeping operations for MND-N when the troopers of Regulator Battery assumed peacekeeping responsibility for Banovici and Zivinici. Other activities included weapons storage site inspections, removal of roadblocks, and confiscation of illegally cached weapons. Thunder Squadron also conducted joint patrols with Turkish, Russian, Estonian, Polish, Swedish, and Danish troops.

Longknife Squadron was paired with the 49th Aviation Brigade of the Texas National Guard to form the Joint Aviation Brigade for the SFOR 7 rotation. Long Knife aviators supported reconnaissance, security, and air movement missions with both American and international units flying missions not only for MND-N, but also for Multi-National Divisions Southwest and Southeast. The aircrews of 4th Squadron flew almost 5,000 sorties for over 2,000 missions, logging more than 12,000 hours.

Members of TFR were tasked to perform the Wild Land Fire Fighting mission, by preparing to deploy to any fires east of the Mississippi River. Tiger Squadron conducted a Level I gunnery and a Combined Arms Live Fire Exercise (CALFEX) before preparing to receive regimental units returning from Bosnia.

TFR also represented the regiment at Fort Hood during CPX Ulchi Focus Lens. This exercise simulated the deployment of the regiment to South Korea. Before the troopers of Task Force Eagle could return to Fort Carson, they had to train their replacements to assume the peacekeeping mission. Once this was accomplished, the various units began returning to Fort Carson and the last unit closed on 7 October 2000.

=== Exercise Bright Star ===
Beginning in September 2001, Tiger Squadron, with elements of the regimental headquarters, Longknife and Muleskinner Squadrons, deployed to Egypt to participate in exercise Bright Star 01/02 as part of a Combined Forces Land Component command (CFLCC) coalition. The coalition included elements from the U.S. Marine Corps, Egypt, France, Kuwait, Greece, Italy, and the British Army.

The 3d ACR Troopers took part in field training and live fire exercises while in Egypt. They also conducted training on nuclear, biological, and chemical warfare, night warfare, and the use of smoke on the battlefield. Static displays and briefings on air defense artillery capabilities were also provided. Aviation support was provided for the exercise by Longknife Troopers in the form of medical evacuation and personnel transport, while the Muleskinners of Support Squadron established and operated a logistics support system.

In addition, members of Tiger Squadron and the regimental staff conducted affiliation training with their Egyptian counterparts to teach them to function as observer/controllers (OC) for the forces involved in ground tactical operations, as well as establishing and maintaining communications and command and control between the various multinational OC forces. The terrorist attacks against the U.S. on 11 September was ironically the pre-selected day they were briefed on terrorism as they prepared for the mission. The Pentagon considered sending these troops and assets directly to Afghanistan upon the completion of the historical mission.

=== Operation Iraqi Freedom I: 2003–2004 ===
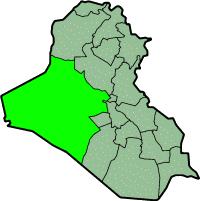
The largely Sunni western Iraq province of Al Anbar is highlighted on this map.

In support of the global war on terror, Coalition forces invaded Iraq in March 2003. The 3d ACR received a deployment order for movement to the CENTCOM AOR on 14 February 2003. Equipment was prepared and moved by rail from Fort Carson to the port at Beaumont, Texas. The advance party, consisting of Fox Troop and other key leaders from Regimental HQ, arrived in Kuwait on 2 April and the remainder of the regiment arrived in Theater by the middle of the month. The first elements of the regiment crossed the border into Iraq on 25 April 2003 and were immediately tasked to perform an economy of force mission to secure and stabilize Al Anbar Governorate in the western part of the country.

TF Rifles successfully performed many missions ranging from offensive operations to civil affairs operations. Daily activities include reconnaissance, security patrols, escort duty, static security, and presence patrols. Killing or capturing former regime loyalists, securing mass grave sites, as well as restoring law and order by assisting Iraqi National Police was also accomplished by TF Rifles. The 3d ACR was focused on securing weapons caches between Lake Tharthar and the Euphrates River, and managed to detain several high-value targets on the Defense Intelligence Agency blacklist. TF Rifles also assisted in training the Iraqi Civil Defense Corps (ICDC), and managed to train over 3,000 recruits.

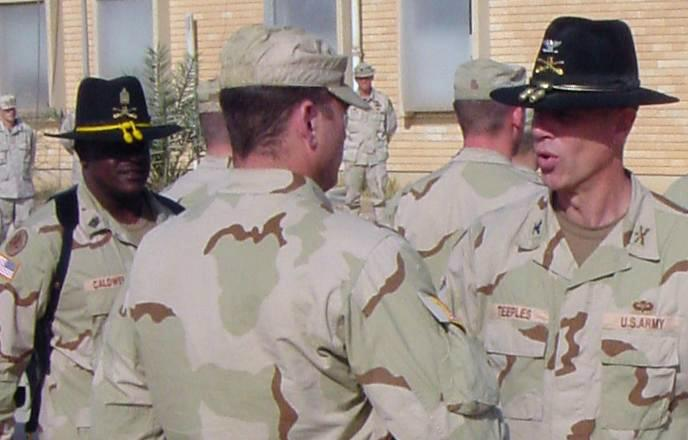
3d Cavalry's commander, COL David Teeples wearing the Cavalry Stetson in Iraq

Significant operations conducted by the 3rd Cavalry included Operation Rifles Blitz on the volatile Syrian border town of Al Qaim and Operation Rifles Fury (a.k.a. Operation Santa's Claws) on the insurgent strongholds of Rawah and Anah. The 3d Cavalry also was responsible for Iraq's border with Saudi Arabia during the Hajj of 2003 and 2004, when thousands of Iraqis had to be searched and processed before they could leave for and return from Mecca.

By the end of August, the Task Force had confiscated 1,080 122 mm artillery rounds, 928 mortar rounds, 8,991 23 mm rounds, 2,828 AK-47s, two pistols, ten anti-tank missiles, forty-five anti-tank mines, eight surface-to-air missiles, four kegs of gunpowder, 300 130 mm high explosive rounds, three boxes of hand grenades, twenty high explosive anti-tank rounds, 125 100 mm tank gun rounds, 134 rocket-propelled grenades, two sniper rifles, thirty 37 mm anti-aircraft rounds, one improvised explosive device, and one SA-7 surface to air guided missile system.

Various units of the Task Force found themselves managing a large number of projects to rebuild the infrastructure and restore basic services, efforts aimed at winning the hearts and minds of the Iraqi people. Many schools in Iraq were found to have been turned into munitions storage facilities, because the regime knew Coalition forces would not attack schools. These schools were cleared, renovated and returned to use.

Longknife Squadron established aerial border qualification standards and became the first aviation unit in theater to operate well inside the five-kilometer buffer zone established by U.S. Central Command. The success of the program resulted in its adoption by CJTF-7 as the theater standard.

Over twenty forward operating bases (FOB) were established in order to provide the best possible living conditions for Task Force personnel, and from which combat, security, and sup-port operations could be conducted throughout a 140,000-square-kilometer area. The various FOBs established by the task force became nodes in a massive logistical network.

For its service in the Operation Iraqi Freedom I, the 3d Armored Cavalry Regiment received the Valorous Unit Award. Approximately 400 citations for valor were also awarded. 33 officers and troopers of the 3d ACR were killed in action, and 18 more from TF Rifles, and 233 more were wounded.

==== First loss ====
Shortly after entering Iraq, the 2nd Squadron of the 3d ACR was tasked with protecting several abandoned enemy ammunition supply points (ASP) and the Air force base located in Al Habbaniyah. On 1 May 2003, after days of responding to reports of arson fires and the looting of ammunition, an M1 Abrams tank crew from H(Heavy) Company patrolling near the Euphrates River, discovered a group of Iraqis deliberately setting fires. This group was seen fanning the flames with a powder that was later discovered to be the propellant from artillery powder bags. These Iraqis attempted to direct the fire toward the troops to get the troops to displace from the area making it possible for them to steal ammunition buried in caches placed along the river and around the abandoned buildings near the company's makeshift compound. While in pursuit of the Iraqis, the fire intensified with high flames surrounding the M1 Abrams. In an attempt to evade the fire, the Tank climbed a berm that quickly gave way forcing the heavy M1 Abrams to plunge nose first into a canal. The Tank quickly took on water and as a result, PFC Jesse Givens, the driver, drowned and became the first 3d ACR soldier lost in Operation Iraqi Freedom.

==== CPT David M. Rozelle ====
CPT David M. Rozelle is the first amputee to return to U.S. military duty in a combat zone. CPT Rozelle deployed to the town of Hit, Iraq as the commander of the 3d ACR's K Troop ("Killer"). During operations in Hit, Rozelle's Humvee ran over an anti-tank mine which destroyed both the Humvee and Rozelle's right-lower leg. This resulted in the amputation of Rozelle's foot and ankle.

After being given an artificial leg, CPT Rozelle returned to duty as commander of the 3d Cavalry's Headquarters Troop ("Remington"). He then redeployed to Iraq with the 3d ACR on their third tour in Iraq. Since his injury, Rozelle has completed the New York Marathon and written the book, Back in Action: An American Soldier's Story of Courage, Faith and Fortitude.

==== "Steve-O" ====
Known as "Steve-O" to protect his identity, this 13-year-old boy was one of the 3d Cavalry's most helpful informants.

Steve-O's father was once an army captain in the Republican Guard and led a 40-man insurgent group after the Coalition invasion. Forced to fight alongside his father against the Americans and severely beaten by his father, Steve-O walked to a 3d Cavalry checkpoint to turn in his father.

After turning in his father, Steve-O turned in a number of other insurgents. Often riding in the back of a Humvee, Steve-O would simply point out people he saw at the meetings of insurgents his father used to take him to. However, with Steve-O's father arrested and his mother killed by insurgents in retribution, Steve-O had nowhere left but to live on Forward Operating Base "Tiger" with the troopers of the 3d Cavalry.

After the 3d Cavalry returned from their year-long deployment to Iraq, Steve-O continued to live on post with the Marines that replaced the cavalry. Eventually, 1SG Daniel Hendrex was able to arrange for Steve-O to leave Iraq and come to the United States.

Steve-O's story came to public attention when he and the troopers responsible for his successful move to the United States appeared on an episode of The Oprah Winfrey Show.

=== Operation Iraqi Freedom III: 2005–2006 ===
The 3d Cavalry only remained stateside for less than a year, before returning to Iraq for a second tour. The 3d Armored Cavalry Regiment deployed to Operation Iraqi Freedom 04–06 in February 2005. The regiment served from South Baghdad province to Western Ninewa Province in Northwestern Iraq until March 2006. The 2nd Battalion of the 325th Airborne Infantry Regiment (of the 82nd Airborne Division) served with the regiment in Iraq from September – December 2005. In September 2005, the 3d Armored Cavalry Regiment conducted 'Operation Restoring Rights' to defeat a terrorist stronghold in the city of Tal Afar.

In July 2005, the Army announced that the regiment would re-station to Fort Hood within months of returning from Operation Iraqi Freedom. The 3d Armored Cavalry Regiment officially departed Fort Carson, Colorado in July 2006.

Two elements of the regiment stayed behind at Fort Carson and were subsequently re-flagged. The regiment's aviation element was re-flagged as 1st Squadron, 6th Cavalry, part of the 1st Infantry Division, while the other element was re-flagged as part of the U.S. 4th Infantry Division's 2nd Brigade Combat Team rear detachment.

==== Operation Restoring Rights ====
By the time 3d Cavalry returned to Iraq in 2005, the northern city of Tal Afar had fallen entirely under the control of insurgents. Led by Colonel H.R. McMaster, the 3rd Armored Cavalry Regiment focused first on pacifying the smaller surrounding cities and closing down the nearby Syrian border to prevent supplies and routes of escape to the insurgents occupying the city. The next stage was to build a massive earthen berm that enclosed Tal Afar, the berm was constructed by Alpha Company 113 Engineer Battalion stationed out of Indiana, as law-abiding residents were ordered out to evacuation camps. Operation Restoring Rights included forces from 1st Squadron, 2nd Squadron, Support Squadron, the Air Squadron (4th Squadron), and various US Special Forces formations. Additionally, Iraqi Army formations moved into the city en masse, consisting of 5,000 soldiers from the Iraqi Army 3rd Division (partnered with the 3d Armored Cavalry Regiment), 1,000 soldiers from the 1st Battalion of the 1st Brigade of the 2nd Iraqi Army Division (from Irbil and partnered with the US Special Forces), and Iraqi Special Forces commandos.

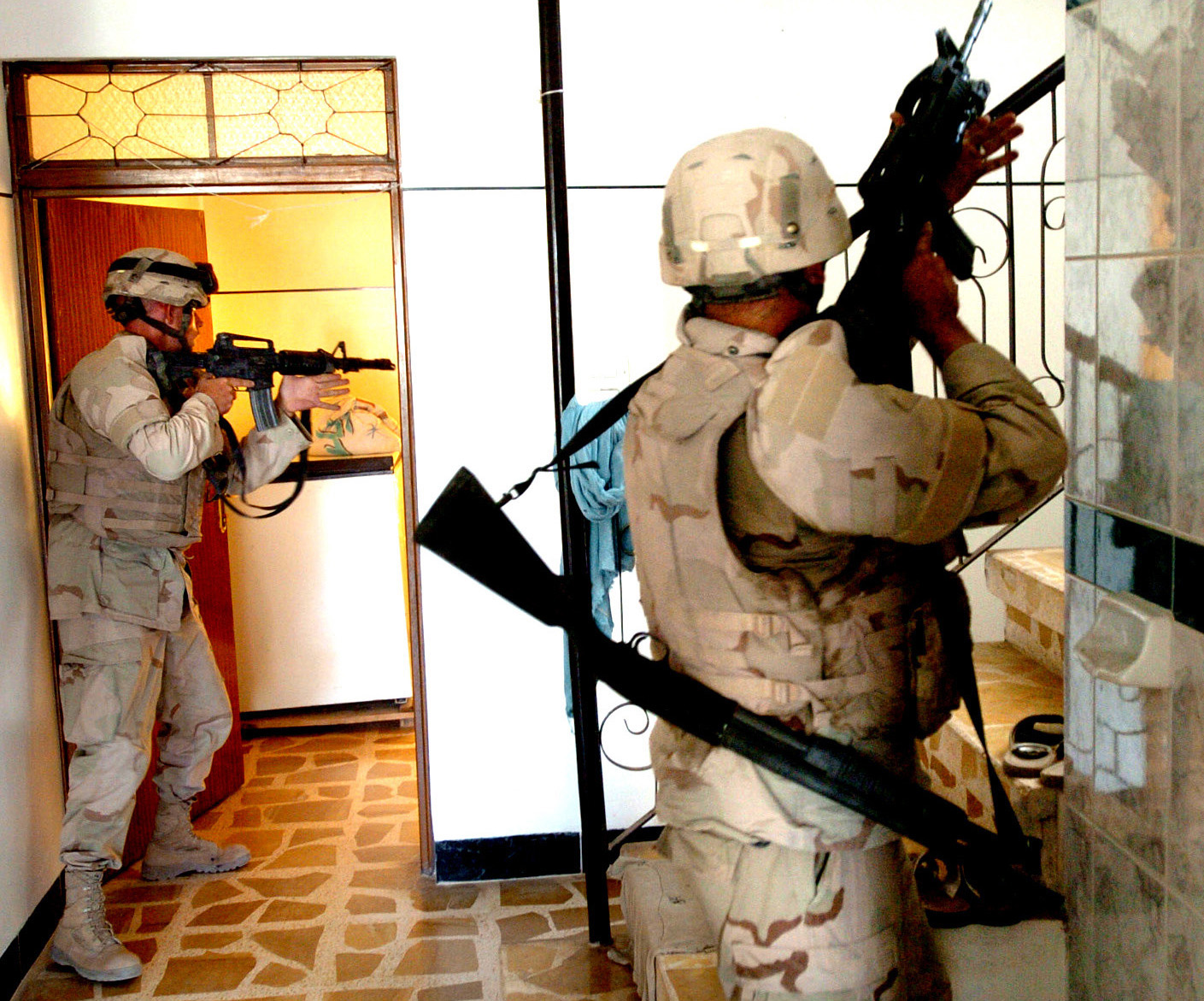
Soldiers searching for insurgents in Tal Afar

Additionally, an Iraqi police brigade and Mosul Police units moved in to provide perimeter security. Operation Restoring Rights began in late August 2005 as 1st Squadron and its Iraqi Army Brigade moved into Tal Afar and began conducting focused raids on the Western part of Tall Afar, while 2nd Squadron and its Iraqi Army Brigade moved to isolate the enemy strongpoint in the Sarai District. Meanwhile, as the regiment moved to isolate the eastern portion of the city, the enemy put up an intense fight against 1st Squadron as they pursued them relentlessly through the western part of the city. Apache attack and Kiowa scout helicopters from 4th Squadron tracked the enemy while ground forces pursued them into their safe haven, destroying them with direct fire from ground platforms and hellfire missiles from the air. Air Force munitions were used against especially hardened defensive positions.

As 2nd Squadron and an Iraqi Army battalion from the 2nd Iraqi Army Division moved into place, they received critical intelligence on the enemy battle positions and Improvised Explosive Devices (IEDs) that allowed them to destroy the enemy in detail with precision fires from the Apache and Kiowa helicopters and with USAF support. Over half of the enemy leadership was killed or captured in the days leading up to the assault on the Sarai. 2nd Squadron, 1st Squadron, and elements of Support Squadron manning checkpoints, captured over 1,200 enemy fighters as they tried to flee the city, some even hiding behind children and dressed as women. The regiment attacked into the Sarai and cleared it of the remaining enemy, finding a complex enemy training base within the ancient structures.

After the regiment returned from Iraq, Tal Afar Mayor Mayor Najim Abdullah al Jubori sent a letter to Gen. George Casey, the senior U.S. commander in Iraq, thanking the 3d Cavalry for liberating his town. The Mayor's letter became the subject of widespread media attention after U.S. President George W. Bush mentioned it during a speech in March 2006.

==== Post OIF 04-06 ====
Following OIF 04–06, the regiment relocated from Fort Carson, Colorado to Fort Hood, Texas. The regiment officially completed its move in July 2006. On 29 June 2006, COL H.R. McMaster completed his command and officially gave the guidon to COL Michael Bills. The 3d ACR began training for another tour in OIF right away, fielding new weapons systems (including new M1A2 Abrams tanks and M3A3 Bradley fighting vehicles) and re-build the organization following the move from Fort Carson. In July the regiment completed a successful NTC rotation 07–09.

=== Operation Iraqi Freedom 2007–2009 ===
On 25 October 2007, the regiment began its third tour in Iraq. 1st and 3rd Squadrons are deployed in the Ninawa Province, 2nd Squadron was deployed to eastern Diyala province until OCT when it rejoined the regiment in Mosul. 1st Squadron in Qayarrah, and 3rd Squadron in Mosul. Because Mosul is the most violent major city in Iraq, Heavy Company, Eagle Troop and 43rd Combat Engineer Company (2/3 ACR) were attached to 3rd Squadron to help with increased insurgent activity. A platoon from 43rd Combat Engineer Company 3rd PLT (heavy blue) was attached to Heavy Company also 3rd Platoon Heavy Company attached to Lightning Troop, becoming Lightning 5th Platoon, "Gold Platoon" in order to help bear the largest, and most dangerous area of the city. 4th Squadron is served in Baghdad. Thunder Squadron was part of several major operations in order to clear the city of insurgents, including Operations Lions Roar, which was praised as one of the turning points in the war on terror.

1st Squadron's King Battery (attached to 4th Stryker Brigade, 2nd Infantry Div., and then 1/25th SBCT) firing artillery and is split between three FOBs (Warhorse, Normandy & Diyala Media Center), which allows the Battery to cover the entire Diyala Province. Firing over 7,700 rounds in eleven months, King Battery has destroyed the previous record which was set by a battalion-size element.

2nd Squadron minus, composed of Grim Troop, Fox Troop, Lion Battery and the Squadron Headquarters and Headquarters Troop spent the bulk of the deployment at FOB Caldwell in Eastern Diyala Province, where it was responsible for 62% of the battle space of 4/2 ID. During the deployment 2nd Squadron passed from the operational control of 4/2 ID to 2nd SCR where they remained until they rejoined 3rd ACR in OCT 2008. 2nd Squadron conducted several major operations during its time in Diyala including Operation Raider Harvest, which removed most of the last pockets of organized resistance in Diyala in the vicinity of Muqdadiyah. 2nd Squadron also spearheaded Operation Sabre Tempest, the largest combined Iraqi Army–U.S. Army air assault mission of OIF. This operation and several follow-on operations cleared and secured Diyala Province from Baqubah to the Iranian border. Having completed its mission in Diyala, 2nd Squadron rejoined the rest of 3rd ACR in Mosul in OCT 2008 where it assumed an area of responsibility between 1st and 3rd Squadrons. On rejoining the regiment, Grim Troop, from 2nd Squadron was awarded the Draper Award for Leadership Excellence. 2nd Squadron held this area and in combined operations with Iraqi security forces destroyed numerous caches and detained more than 50 insurgents before the squadron's redeployment to Fort Hood in January 2009.

==== Post OIF 07-09 ====
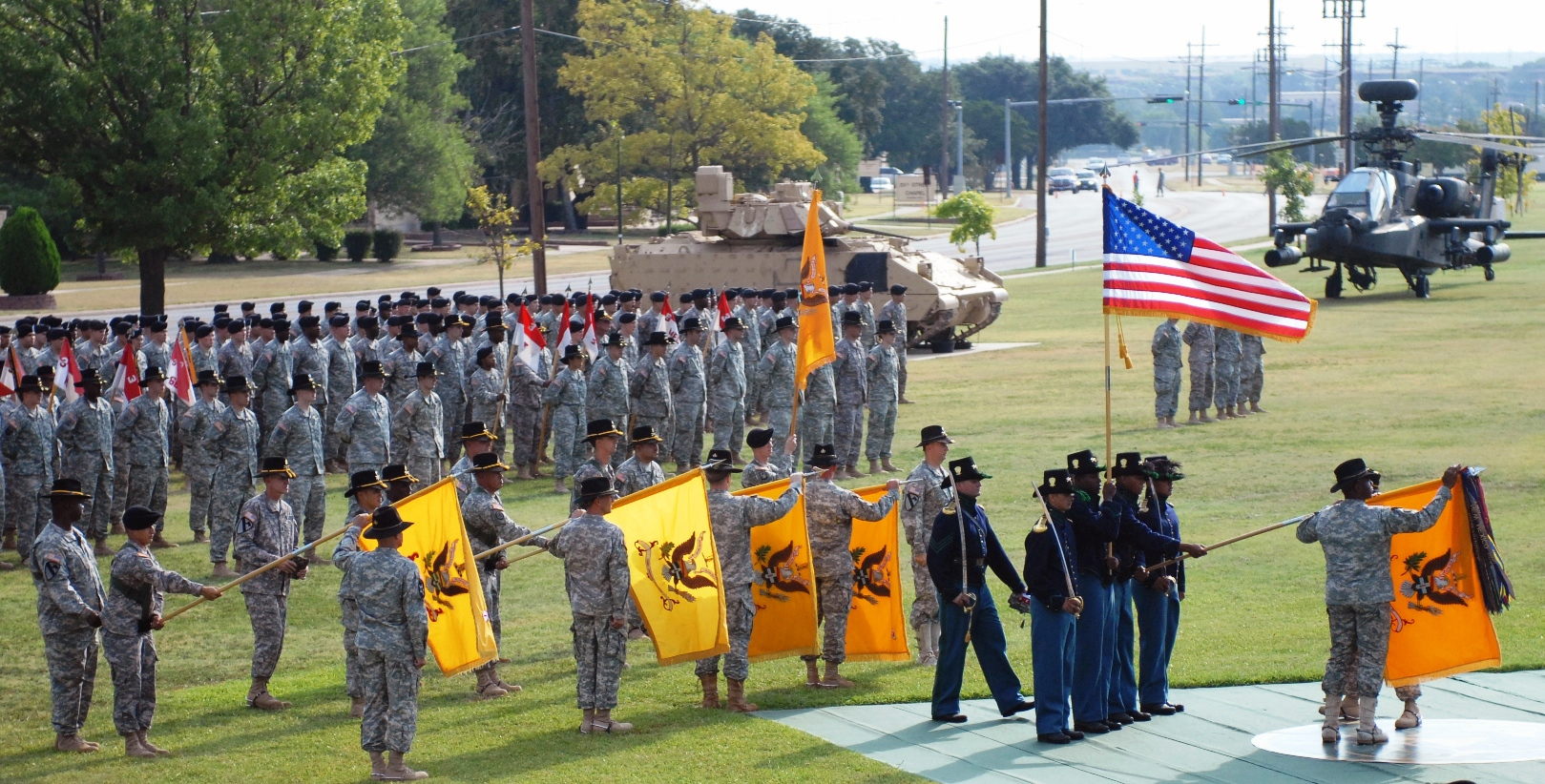
Colors casing ceremony Aug 2010 before deploying to Iraq

On 3 April 2009, Reginald E. Allen became the 73rd Colonel of the Regiment, the first African-American to command a United States Cavalry Regiment; he commanded with Jonathan J. Hunt, the XVIIIth Regimental Command Sergeant Major. The new command team immediately focused on the reception of equipment from the post-deployment reset program, the integration of newly arrived personnel, and the continuation of individual training. The Squadrons concentrated on weapons qualification, combat life saver training, and mandatory classes and schools through the summer until they began to receive their combat vehicles back from reset. As each unit's tanks and Bradleys arrived, the crews conducted communications and live fire tests as well as driver's training to certify new operators on their equipment. Soldiers also attended refresher training on new equipment and upgrades made during the reset process. With all of their vehicles and weapons finally back from reset, the squadrons accelerated their training pace to prepare for the next deployment to Iraq.

In the fall of 2009, the regiment received orders to deploy to Iraq again the following summer. This time period also marked the beginning of a series of field training exercises that gradually increased in intensity as the squadrons moved into the collective phase of training. Platoon and troop-level situational training exercises (STX) challenged junior leaders to assess their surrounding and decide on a course of action when faced with various tactical scenarios. These exercises also offered the first opportunity to test the new company intelligence support teams (COISTs) that had been selected and trained throughout the summer. The COISTs emphasized the bottom-up development and refinement of intelligence that is fundamental part of counterinsurgency operations in the contemporary operating environment. COIST members practiced debriefing patrols after simulated combat missions and developing an intelligence pictures for the company-level commander to drive future operations. This new capability will provide units with an increased understanding of the environment in their areas of responsibility in their next deployment.

On 5 November 2009, the regiment was called upon again, not to face an overseas threat, but to help protect the members of its own community when a lone attacker opened fire on Soldiers and civilians at Fort Hood's Soldier Readiness Center. Sabre Squadron, the installation's designated crisis reaction battalion at the time of the incident, was alerted to deploy back from training in the field and assist Fort Hood Emergency Services with cordoning the crime scene while the police searched for additional suspects. Joined by Soldiers from Tiger, Thunder, and Muleskinner, Sabre Squadron manned entry control points around the post to systematically search vehicles leaving the installation later that evening and the continued to secure the gates for several days after the attack. When President Obama visited Fort Hood on 10 November to help memorialize the twelve soldiers and one civilian who died in the attack, the regiment teamed with the Directorate of Emergency Services again to secure the route for the official convoy from the airfield to the III Corps headquarters.

In December, the squadrons took to the field for two more weeks of collective training to prepare for the National Training Center rotation scheduled for the following spring. Troops occupied patrol bases outside simulated Iraqi villages across Fort Hood and spent several days developing intelligence, training Iraqi security forces, and conducting reconnaissance operations. These Squadron-level exercises tested the units on the techniques and procedures they had developed throughout the fall and simulated the types of operations they would conduct at the National Training Center the following spring. After a short block leave for the winter holidays, the regiment's troopers began to prepare in earnest for what would likely be the 3d ACR's last heavy stabilized gunnery beginning at the end of January. The Chief of Staff of the Army directed the regiment to convert to a Stryker regiment after the next deployment to Iraq. The announcement came out in the fall but the decision was not final until early 2010. This last stabilized gunnery helped train a new generation of tankers and scouts, many of whom had never fired a formal gunnery due to the high tempo of operational deployments.

As part of the planned Stryker transformation, the regiment also received word that Longknife Squadron would be deactivated in 2010 and reflagged as part of a new combat aviation brigade (CAB) that would be formed at Fort Lewis, but the squadron would remain at Fort Hood until 2012 as part of the new split-based CAB. The aviation squadron continued its training and crew certification program throughout this time period, including two deployments to the Joint Readiness Training Center at Fort Polk supporting other deploying brigades and then supporting the regiment with attack and lift capabilities at a mission readiness exercise at the NTC in May/June 2010.

The regiment's NTC rotation 10–07 at Fort Irwin set the conditions for the regiment's pending deployment. Because of the extensive training and extended dwell, the regiment entered the rotation at higher training level than most units and as such was able to ramp up the training faster using less situational training exercise (STX) days and spending more days fully exercising all systems in the regiment.

=== Operation New Dawn: 2010–2011 ===
The regiment's fourth deployment in seven years was different from the previous three, as an advise and assist regiment/brigade (AAB) in support of Operation New Dawn. On 30 Sep 2010, the regiment conducted a transition of authority with 3rd BDE, 3rd ID and assumed responsibility for the five northern provinces of United States Division-South under MG Vincent Brooks and the 1st Infantry Division. Later in the deployment the regiment was under the operational control of the Texas Army National Guard's 36th Infantry Division.

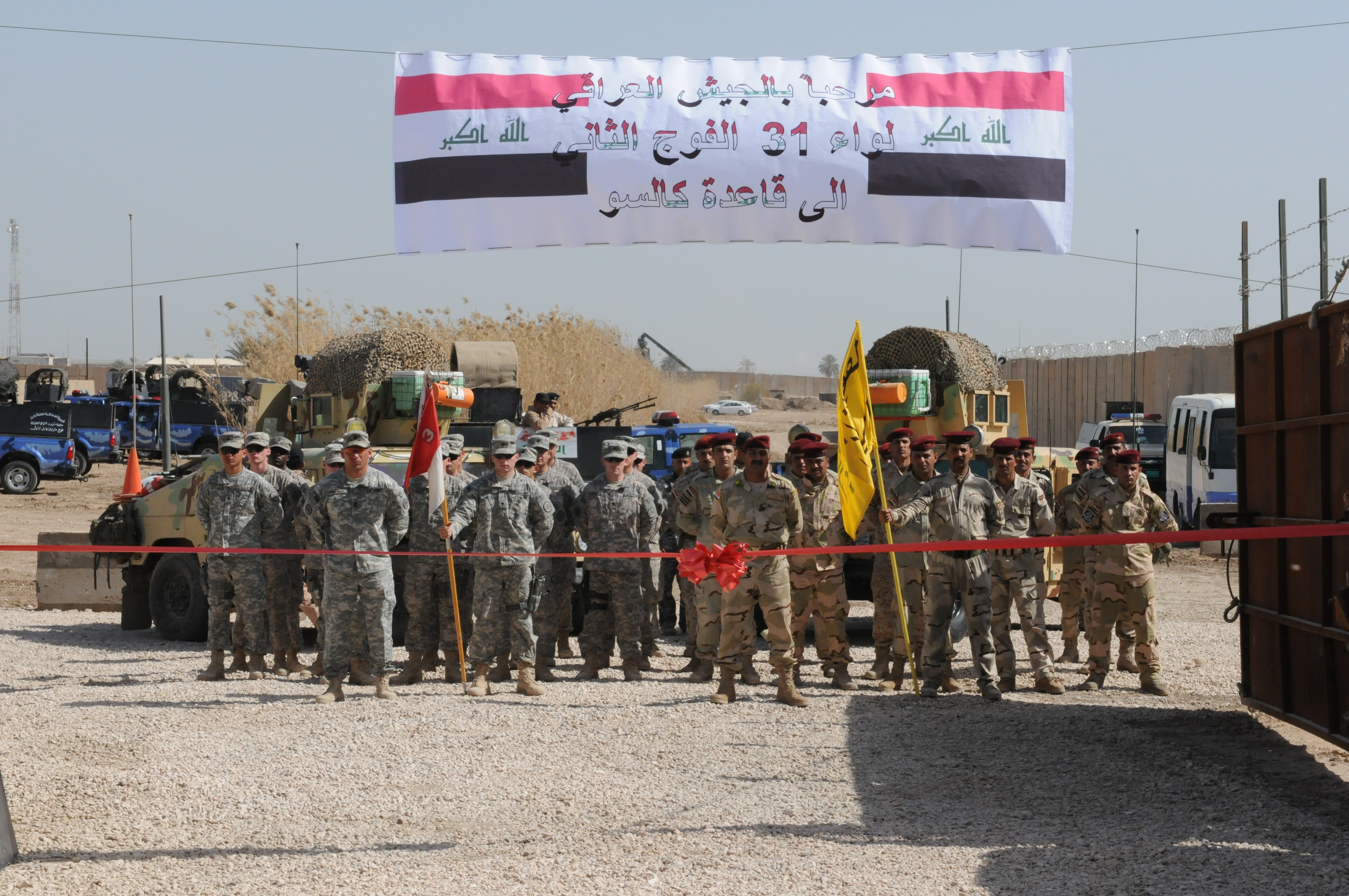
3rd ACR & ISF base transfer ceremony in Iraq

The regiment's area of operations included the Iraqi provinces of Babil, Karbala, Najaf, Diwaniyah (Qadisiyah), and Wasit; an area roughly the size of South Carolina. After assuming operational authority as the first AAB deployed during Operation New Dawn, 3rd ACR's mission was to conduct stability operations in support of the United States Department of State provincial reconstruction teams (PRTs) and to advise, train, and assist Iraqi security forces (ISF) of the 8th Iraqi Army (IA) Division and the 3rd and 5th Directorates of Border Enforcement (DBE) Regions. 3d ACR's geographical terrain was the largest operational environment (OE) in the United States Forces-Iraq OE, encompassing approximately 64,700 square kilometers of desert, agricultural fields and urban terrain. Within this diverse area, the human terrain of OE Rifles included the cultural fault line between the Shi'a population in southern Iraq and the Sunni population in central Iraq.

In the operation the regiment executed more than 12,000 dismounted and mounted patrols, 76 named operations, 3,500 operations in partnership with various Iraqi security force counterparts, more than 1300 key leader engagements (KLEs), and trained more than 14,000 ISF personnel. 3rd ACR Troopers maintained a high tempo of operations, intelligence gathering and analysis, and stability support and development during the year long deployment. In conjunction with Department of State personnel, the 3d Armored Cavalry Regiment also completed more than 200 civil projects with a value of $49.7M.

=== Change of Mission ===
On 16 November 2011, COL Reginald Allen, the 73rd Colonel of the Regiment, cased the colors of the 3d Armored Cavalry Regiment, and uncased the colors of the 3d Cavalry Regiment while handing over command to COL John B. Richardson IV, the 74th Colonel of the Regiment. This transition marked a change of mission from conducting Corps-level reconnaissance and security, to a combined-arms Stryker regiment able to conduct decisive action missions in support of unified land operations anywhere in the world. The regiment's size expanded as well, and a Fires Squadron (Steel) was added, and 4th Squadron (Longknife) was made a ground reconnaissance unit. 1st, 2nd, and 3rd Squadrons were reorganized as Stryker infantry formations, and a Signal and Anti-Armor Troop were added as well. The attached 89th Chemical Company was inactivated, however. In effect, the 3d Cavalry Regiment had returned to its roots as the Regiment of Mounted Riflemen. Despite concerns from the ranks, COL Richardson assured that the 3d Cavalry would always keep its history, lineage, and traditions despite changes in organizational structure.

=== War in Afghanistan ===
In 2014 and 2015, the regiment had subordinate units all across the globe. It was fighting (including conducting stability activities) and training worldwide.

==== Operation Enduring Freedom; June–October 2014 ====
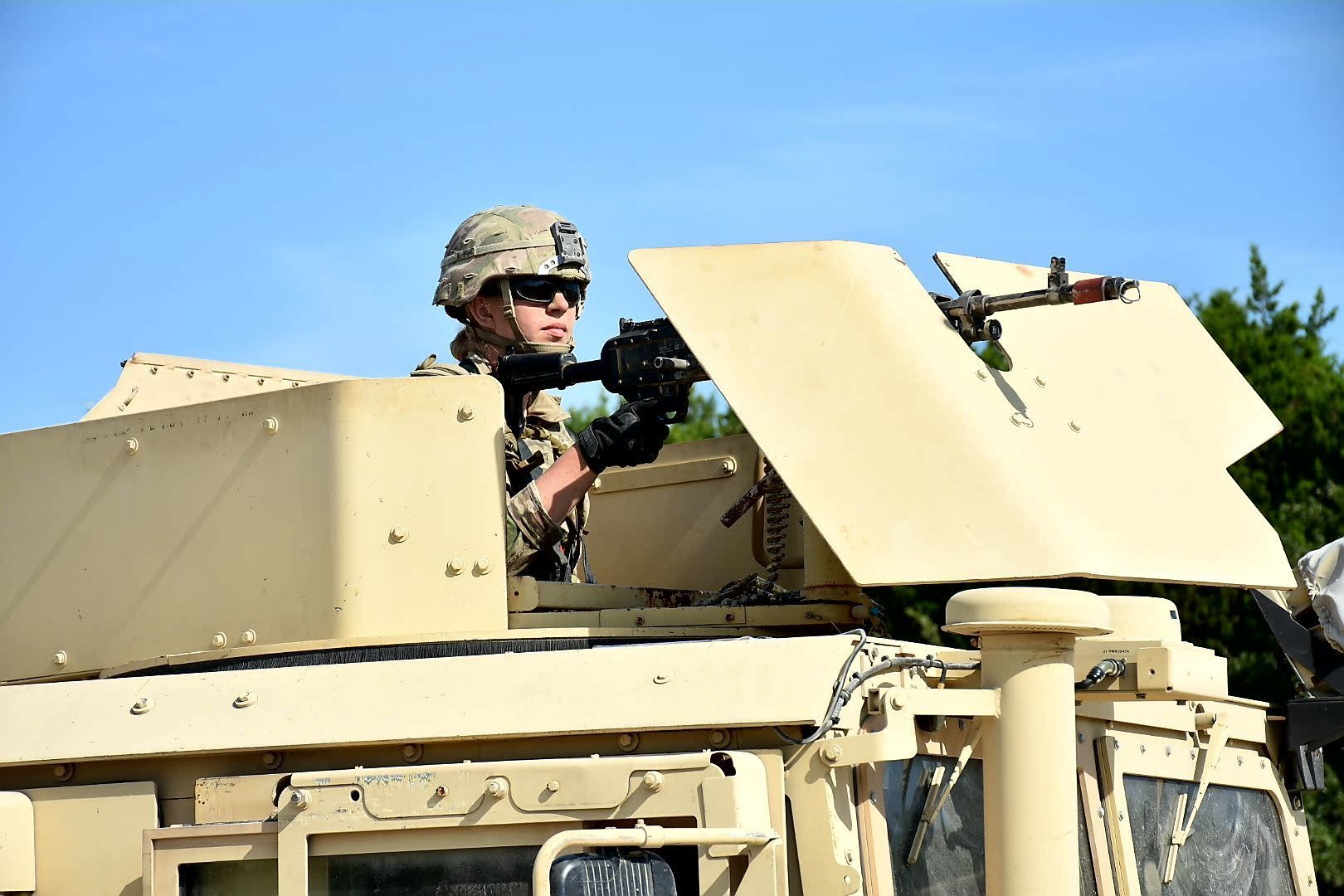
Soldier from 3rd Squadron of the 3rd Cavalry Regiment during exercise, August 2019

In 2014, the regiment received its first orders to Afghanistan. While the 3d Cavalry had been engaged in the Iraq War from 2004 to 2011, this was the first time the regiment would be deployed in support of Operation Enduring Freedom. At the same time as the main body of the 3d Cavalry would deploy to Afghanistan, 4th Squadron joined 13 other states forming part of the Multinational Force and Observers (MFO) in the Sinai Peninsula. The MFO guards the agreed boundaries between Egypt and Israel.

Meanwhile, C (Crazy Horse) Troop would deploy to Guantánamo Bay, Cuba to assist the Joint Detention Group in securing the strategic site. This would be the second time that 3d Cavalry troopers deployed to Guantanamo Bay; the first time was in 1898 during the Spanish–American War. While serving simultaneously in Afghanistan, the Sinai Peninsula, Guantanamo Bay, and Fort Hood, the sun never set on the 3d Cavalry Regiment.

In Afghanistan, the Brave Rifles' first priority was to prepare for the US withdrawal of the country and shrink the US footprint in Regional Command East (RC East). They partnered with Afghan National Army, Afghan Border Police, and Afghan National Police units on nearly all their missions and helped transition security operation fully to the Afghan security forces. The regiment started its deployment working with the ANA's 203rd Corps, which was responsible for security in Logar Province, Khost Province, Paktia Province, Maidan Wardak Province, Ghazni Province, Bamyan Province, and Paktika Province. The regimental HQ and 1st Squadron (Tiger) occupied FOB Lightning near Gardez in Paktya Province, and worked with Afghan troops from 203rd Corps out of FOB Thunder nearby. Here, the troopers assisted and advised the Afghan troops from the individual to Corps level and mentored the Afghan National Police Paktya Regional HQ, Afghan Border Police Zone 402, and the Afghan National Civil Order Police 5th Brigade operating in the 203rd Corps AOR. FOB Lightning was signed over to Afghan troops on 1 October 2014.

The regiment then assumed another important duty; escorting ballot boxes from across their seven provinces and ensuring they return safely to Kabul. 1st, 2nd, 3rd, and the RFAS Squadron all contributed to escorting the ballots safely, and helped shape the future of Afghanistan as President Ashraf Ghani emerged as the victor. 2nd Squadron (Sabre) and the Regimental Support Squadron (Muleskinner) occupied FOB Shank in Logar Province. Muleskinner ran a Level II treatment facility there and conducted critical logistics operations. 2nd Squadron worked closely with the 4th Brigade of the 203rd Corps to conduct security operations until FOB SHank was goven to the Afghans on 23 October 2014.

3rd Squadron (Thunder) also advised the Afghan 4th Brigade of the 203rd Corps out of FOB Airborne in Wardak Province. Thunder turned over the FOB to the ANA on 5 September 2014 and was subsequently sent to FOB Dwyer in RC South to assist the 1st Cavalry Division in stability and security operations. During this time, the 1st Battalion, 504th Infantry Regiment, "Red Devils," of the 82nd Airborne Division was attached to the 3d Cavalry Regiment and conducted security operation in Ghazni Province until September 2014.

==== Operation Resolute Support; October 2014 – March 2015 ====
After the Brave Rifles had completed their operations in southeast Afghanistan, they moved northeast to Laghman Province and Nangahar Province. Replacing the 2nd Brigade (Strike) of the 101st Airborne Division at Tactical Base Gamberi and nearby Operational Base Fenty, they took over security for the region, including Jalalabad Airfield, the last US operated airfield in eastern Afghanistan. During this time, 2nd Squadron was sent to Bagram Airfield in central Afghanistan and took over security there, and 3rd Squadron (as stated previously) was sent to join units of the 1st Cavalry Division. Operation Resolute Support began on 1 January 2015, and signified the end of Operation Enduring Freedom, and the change of responsibility from Coalition to Afghan Forces. Regional Commands North, South, East, and West were renamed Train, Advise, and Assist Commands North, South, East, and West.

The Afghan security forces were now fully responsible for their country's security, and only 9,800 US troops remained in country to act as advisers. Around 1,000 of these belonged to the 3d Cavalry Regiment, now present in TAAC-East, TAAC-South, and Bagram Airfield. Brave Rifles HQ coordinated with the Afghan 201st Corps to secure the Afghanistan-Pakistan border out of TB Gamberi. The Brave Rifles completed their mission of training and advising on 15 February 2015, and turned over responsibility to the 3rd Brigade (Rakassans), 101st Airborne Division. The 3d Cavalry arrived safely back in Texas by the end of March 2015. The regiment suffered the last two casualties of OEF, with the death of a platoon sergeant and his gunner, both members of their Sapper element (43d Combat Engineer Company).

==== Afghanistan 2016–2017 ====
3d CR was deployed to numerous locations in Afghanistan from the spring of 2016 to mid-February 2017. Tasked with stabilization, training the ANA, and security in Paktia, Helmund province and JBAD. serving on missions known as "fly to advise" and assisting in the fight against the Taliban and ISISK.

=== Operation Inherent Resolve 2018–2019 ===
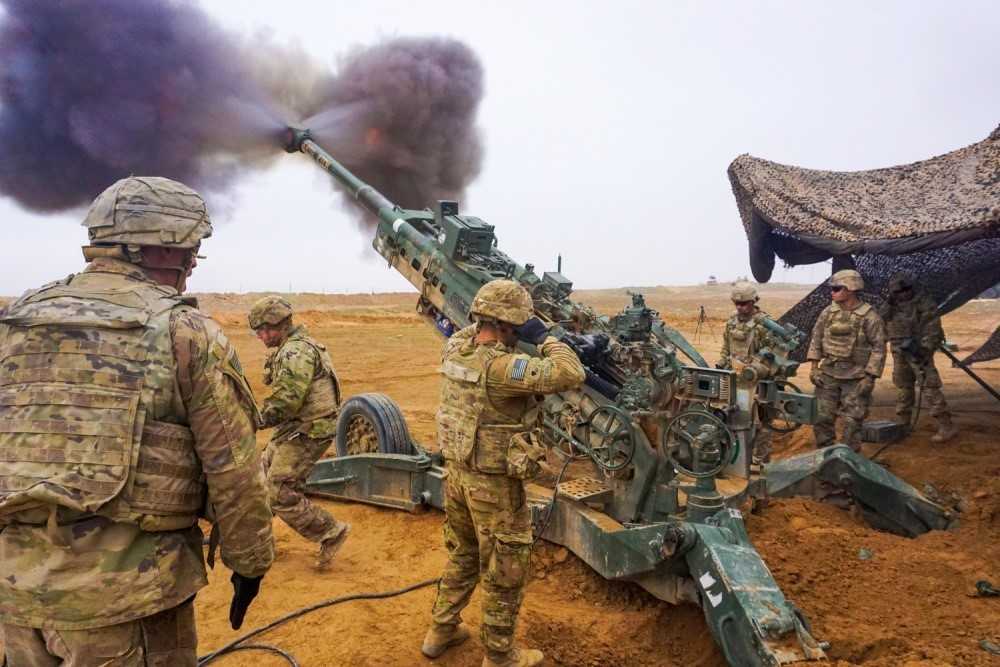
Soldiers of the Regiment's Fire Artillery Squadron fire a M777 artillery piece during Operation Inherent Resolve.

In 2018 the Army reported 3d Cavalry Regiment assumed the mission of 3rd Brigade Combat Team "Patriots," 10th Mountain Division in Iraq as part of Combined Joint Task Force – Operation Inherent Resolve (CJTF-OIR). The regiment worked and trained with Iraqi Security Forces and coalition partners to defeat ISIS in designated areas of Iraq and Syria. Units from the 3d Cavalry Regiment oversaw the security of remote firebases and tactical areas that conducted cross-border firers during the fight against remnants of ISIS. The Field Artillery Squadron fired over 5,000 rounds of 155mm ordinance during their deployment.

In June 2019 Regimental Sergeant Major Adam Nash reported that 3d Cavalry Regiment "had a squadron headquarters and some elements in Syria that were providing force protection and conducting some operations there."

The unit did not report any casualties during the deployment. The unit did engage in combat operations in support of the operation as the unit did report that they had awarded Combat Infantryman's Badges and Combat Action Badges.

== Honors ==
=== Unit decorations ===
Ribbon	Award	Action	Period of award	Orders	Date of award
	Presidential Unit Citation	For service at Bastogne in World War II (3rd and 21st Tank Battalions)	18 – 27 Dec 44	kk	6 Jun 62
	Valorous Unit Award	For service in Operation Iraqi Freedom I (Award Orders:)	25 Apr – 18 Sep 03	038-22	7 Feb 12
	Valorous Unit Award	For service in Operation Iraqi Freedom 04-06 (Regimental HQ, 1st, 2nd, 4th, and Support Squadrons)	18 May – 23 Sep 05	049-10	18 Feb 10
	Valorous Unit Award	For service in Operation Iraqi Freedom 04-06 (3rd Squadron)	15 Jan 05 – 14 Jan 06	070-17	10 Mar 08
	Valorous Unit Award	For service in Operation Iraqi Freedom 07-09 (2nd Squadron)	11 Dec 07 – 28 Dec 08	174-06	23 Jun 09
	Valorous Unit Award	For service in Operation Iraqi Freedom 07-09 (3rd Squadron)	5 Dec 07 – 1 Apr 08	163-04	12 Jun 09
	Valorous Unit Award	For service in Operation Iraqi Freedom 07-09 (4th Squadron)	23 Mar 08 – 5 Jun 08	GO 2014–55	25 Aug 14

== Heraldry ==
Motto: "Brave Rifles! Veterans! You have been baptized in fire and blood and have come out steel."

The regiment's original green facings on the uniform is shown by the color of the shield. The unit's first engagement was the capture of Vera Cruz, and it continued with especially distinguished service throughout the campaign of 1847 to the capture of Mexico City. Upon entering the city, it hoisted the Stars and Stripes over the national palace and displayed the regimental standard from the palace balcony, which drew from General Scott the statement, "Brave Rifles! Veterans! You have been baptized in fire and blood and have come out steel." The campaign is shown by the cross for Vera Cruz and the tower in green (the Mexican color) for fortified Mexico City, the first and last engagements thereof. The chief, taken from the arms of Lorraine, commemorates the regiment's World War I service.

The regiment's original gold trumpet insignia is shown on the crest of the coat of arms. The original branch insignia of the Regiment of Mounted Riflemen was this trumpet instead of the crossed sabers of the dragoon regiments, which were the only other mounted units in the Army at that time. The trumpet surmounts the crest on the Regimental Coat of Arms and appears on the present day Regimental Distinct Unit Insignia (DUI). Affectionately known as the "Bug" due to its shape, this distinctive insignia was originally approved for the 3d Cavalry Regiment on 25 November 1922, and amended to revise its description on 5 January 1923. On 18 December 1951, this insignia was re-designated for the 3d Armored Cavalry Regiment. In 2011, the DUI returned to symbolize the 3d Cavalry Regiment.

Interestingly enough, the regiment's DUI (in digital versions at least rather than the version worn on the uniform) is incorrect. If you look closely at the DUI and the unit patch, you'll notice that there is a golden oval behind the head of the trumpet. This oval was originally created for attaching the trumpet to the rest of the insignia for the version worn on the uniform (in order to create a 3D/layered effect), but a printing or design error in the late 20th century connected this piece with the digital versions. Even the U.S. military's Institute of Heraldry, incorrectly maintains that the DUI with the oval is correct - in opposition of both the 3d U.S. Cavalry Association and the Regiment's senior leadership (including the current RCO, COL William Chastain).

3CR and its fellow Cavalry Regiments are unique among the U.S. Army in that they follow different naming conventions, largely intended to maintain their historical connections. For instance, instead of referring to 2CR and 3CR as the "2nd" and "3rd" Cavalry Regiments, the proper nomenclature is "2d" and "3d" (this naming convention does not apply to the individual squadrons). Additionally, because of their Cavalry origin, the squadrons do not follow the typical naming conventions either. For example, instead of referring to Tiger Squadron as "1-3d CR," it is referred to as "1/3d CR."

The coat of arms was originally approved for the 3d Cavalry Regiment on 7 May 1921. It was redesignated for the 3d Cavalry Reconnaissance Squadron, Mechanized on 28 February 1945. The insignia was redesignated for the 3d Armored Cavalry Regiment on 18 December 1951. It was amended to revise the symbolism on 27 June 1960. It was redesignated effective 16 November 2011, for the 3d Cavalry Regiment.

== Lineage ==
The United States Army Center of Military History summarizes the regiment's lineage as follows:

- Constituted 19 May 1846 in the Regular Army as the Regiment of Mounted Riflemen.
- Organized 12 October 1846 at Jefferson Barracks, Missouri. Redesignated 3 August 1861 as 3d United States Cavalry.
- Inactivated 15 July 1942 at Fort Benning, Georgia; personnel and equipment transferred to 3rd Armored Regiment.
- Redesignated 18 January 1943 as 3d Cavalry, Mechanized.
- Activated 15 March 1943 at Camp Gordon, Georgia.
- Regiment broken up 3 November 1943 and its elements reorganized and redesignated as Headquarters and Headquarters Troop, 3d Cavalry Group, Mechanized and the 3rd and 43rd Reconnaissance Squadrons, Mechanized.
- Headquarters and Headquarters Troop, 3d Cavalry Group, Mechanized, inactivated 22 December 1945 at Camp Kilmer, New Jersey.
- Activated 26 February 1946 at Fort George G. Meade, Maryland.
- Redesignated 5 November 1948 as Headquarters and Headquarters Company, 3d Armored Cavalry Regiment; organization of the remainder of 3rd Armored Cavalry completed 3 November 1948 by redefinition of elements of 3rd and 43rd Cavalry Reconnaissance Squadrons, Mechanized and by reconstruction, redefinition, and activation of certain other elements of the 3rd Cavalry which had been inactivated or demobilized 1921–1928.
- 3rd, 777th, and 21st Tank Battalions consolidated with 3rd Armored Cavalry 8 January 1951. (Battalions and Companies redesignated Squadrons and Troops, 1 June 1960).

More on the regiment's lineage as follows:

- Relocated in 1972 from Ft. Lewis, Washington to Ft. Bliss, Texas
- Relocated to Ft. Carson, Colorado in 1996
- Relocated to Ft. Hood, Texas on 13 July 2006
- Redesignated 16 November 2011 as 3d Cavalry Regiment and reorganized as a Stryker Brigade Combat Team.

== See also ==
- List of United States Regular Army Civil War units
