= Advising Platform Lightning =

Advising Platform Lightning ~~Forward Operating Base Lightning~~
- Near Gardez, Paktia Province in Afghanistan

Site information
- Owner: Afghanistan
- Operator: NATO/Resolute Support Mission

Location
- Shown within Afghanistan
- Coordinates: 33°34′45″N 69°16′31″E

Site history
- Built: 2005
- In use: Unknown-March 2020

Garrison information
- Garrison: Task Force Southeast
- Occupants: E Troop 153rd Cavalry 53rd IBCT

Airfield information
- Elevation: 7,500 feet (2,286 m) AMSL
Helipads
Number	Length and surface
01	35 metres (115 ft) Concrete

Advising Platform Lightning or more simply AP Lightning was an installation used by Task Force Southeast to train 203rd Corps of the Afghan National Army and the 303rd Afghanistan National Police Zone Headquarters. It was formerly named Forward Operating Base (FOB) Lightning, an American military base in Paktia Province, Afghanistan. It was closed in March 2020.

Deployed units;

- 4th Brigade Combat Team “Highlanders”, 1st Armored Division ( - April 2013)
