= Battle of the Florida Mountains =

Part of the Apache War (1861)

- Part of the American Civil War; Apache Wars
Date	Mid August, 1861
Location	Florida Mountains, Confederate Arizona; Modern Day: Luna County, New Mexico
Result	Confederate victory

Belligerents
(Confederate States of America) Confederate States	Apache

Commanders and leaders
(Confederate States of America) Thomas J. Mastin	Mangas Coloradas, Cochise

Strength
35 militia	~100 warriors

Casualties and losses
None	None

The Battle of the Florida Mountains was an action of the Apache Wars. Forces involved were Chiricahua Apache warriors and mounted Confederate States militia. The battle occurred in a pass of the Florida Mountains within Confederate Arizona, now southwestern New Mexico. The engagement occurred sometime around the middle of August 1861.

== Background ==
Mangas Coloradas, chief of the Gila River Apaches, fought Confederate soldiers throughout Arizona's rebellious period. The Arizona Guards, a force of Confederate militia recruited in Traditional Arizona, were in action almost immediately after their induction into service on August 1, 1861. In early August, a group of Arizonans known as the Ake Party were traveling from the Tucson region to the western side of the Rio Grande near Mesilla. Most of them had left their town of Tubac after the siege of their old presidio. By mid-August, they had nearly made it to the river when they were ambushed by a force of Apache warriors. This engagement became known as the Battle of Cookes Canyon. Word of the engagement and the plunder of hundreds of heads of livestock led to the Arizona Guards' involvement in this Apache campaign.

== Battle ==
As soon as Thomas J. Mastin, captain of the Arizona Guards, received the Ake Party's distress call, he realized that a nighttime pursuit would likely lead to an ambush of the pursuers. Captain Mastin ordered the pursuit to begin the next morning. Mastin did not head for Cooke's Canyon, however, as he had a hunch as to where the Apaches were headed with their stolen property. Instead, he ordered the militia to proceed to the passes over the Florida Mountains, near the Mexican border. Mastin knew that the Apaches could not travel very fast with stolen livestock.

The captain and 35 of his men arrived at the base of the mountains early the next day. There they settled themselves in the foothills and awaited the fleeing Apaches. Mastin's hunch had paid off. The Arizona Guards occupied their new post in the Florida Mountains for only a short time when their pickets reported the approach of the Native warriors. The Arizonans charged the Apaches as they entered the pass, and a running fight ensued. The Apaches were routed, and much of the livestock was recaptured. As many as eight of the Apaches were killed, with no loss to the Confederate forces.

The Arizona Guards pursued the Apaches back to Cooke's Canyon, where they attempted to regroup. A small skirmish was fought with no casualties inflicted to either side. The Apaches retreated to their usual strongholds in northern Mexico.

== Aftermath ==
Governor John R. Baylor heard of the Arizona Guard's victory in the Florida Mountains; however, the success was overshadowed by two defeats at the hands of Mescalero Apaches within ten days of the Florida Mountains battle. These engagements occurred at and near Fort Davis, Texas, so Baylor's men were not involved in the fighting. Captain Mastin would go on to lead the Arizona Guards to victory at the Battle of Pinos Altos, where he was mortally wounded.

== See also ==
- American Indian Wars
