= Lost Adams Diggings =

Ghost town and a legend of a lost gold mine in the U.S. state of New Mexico

Adams Diggings, New Mexico
- Ghost town
- Location within the state of New Mexico
- Coordinates: 34°28′10″N 108°17′5″W
- Country: United States
- State: New Mexico
- County: Catron

Population (2000)
  - Total: 0
- Time zone: UTC-5 (Mountain (MST))
  - Summer (DST): MDT
- Area code: 575

The lost Adams Diggings are the subject of a Southwestern treasure story, dating to the early 1860s, that refers to the existence of a canyon rich in gold deposits somewhere in western New Mexico.

== Legend ==
Adams, for whom the legend became known and whose first name is lost to history, was born in Rochester, New York, on July 10, 1829. In August 1864 he was journeying in his wagon from Los Angeles to Tucson. After Apaches set his wagon on fire, Adams drove a dozen saved horses towards Sacaton, Arizona, with the hope to sell them. In Sacaton, Adams met a group of twenty-one miners led by John Brewer traveling together in search of the gold fields. The party also included Pima-Mexican guide who promised the prospectors to lead them to the valley of gold :“I know a place where canyon walls cry tears of [gold] every day! And those tears are larger than your coins!” Supposedly, In 1862, the young Pima-Mexican had gone on an expedition with the Apaches during which they attacked Pueblo Indians in western New Mexico. While on the expedition he had seen gold nuggets that were larger than oak nuts. The young man had an appreciation for works made out of silver and turquoise but had no knowledge of gold value. The miners made a bargain with the guide who only asked for a horse, a saddle, a weapon and some of the gold in exchange. The group was badly in need of horses, and when by fate Adams appeared in Sacaton with his twelve head, Brewer struck a deal with Adams on the terms that Adams would share leadership with him in exchange for donating his horses.

Twenty-two men set out on August 20. Along with their guide the group followed White River and its east fork into the White Mountains and entered western New Mexico. The guide paused and pointed to two mountains that were shaped like sugar loaves. “The gold canyon lies at the foot of those peaks,” the guide said. According to Adams, from that mountain lookout the miners were able to observe San Francisco Mountains. Adams thought that this mountain range was located on Mt. Ord, or on one of the mountaintops nearby. The miners entered a canyon with a fantastic gold deposit through 'the Little Door', as Adams referred to it. He said that the passageway was so narrow that the riders had to enter it one by one. They descended a canyon via a Z-shaped trail. At the bottom of the canyon was a spring with a low falls above it.

Within a few days the group collected a fortune of gold nuggets that they hid in a corn-grinding basin left by ancient Indians. The young guide left the miners on the first night after the discovery and after being paid. Before leaving the guide issued a warning. He told the group not to stay long in the canyon that was a campsite for Apaches. Apache Chief Nana and 30 warriors appeared the second day. The chief told them not to go above the falls. Some of the men started construction of a cabin. A cache of the gold was hidden under the cabin's hearth stone. The miners continued to mine the gold until they ran out of supplies. The party decided to send Brewer and five others to buy more supplies at Old Fort Wingate, west of modern Grants.

After Brewer's party left, some of the men began secretly searching above the falls. They returned to camp with large nuggets. Adams warned them against it but the nuggets were kept.

Nine days after the provisions party did not return, Adams became concerned about their safety. Along with another miner named Davidson, Adams climbed out of the canyon to discover five bodies on the trail, Brewer was not among them. They raced back towards camp, but it was too late. A large party of Indians had reached the camp and killed the remaining miners. The cabin had been set on fire, making the hearth stone too hot to move. Thirteen days later, Adams and Davidson were found by a military patrol out of Fort Apache, AZ.

Upon recovery Adams settled in California and when the Apache Wars ended, he led several expeditions to find the canyon and the basin filled with gold. Adams must have had a terrible sense of direction, after so many years of searching his quest proved hopeless. But in his search he inspired others to join the hunt.

In July 1949, 83-year-old Robert W. "Bob" Lewis, who said he had known Adams when he had been a cowpuncher and law officer in Socorro County, New Mexico, stated that he and Adams searched for the gold together in 1889, twenty five years after the massacre in 1864. But, it was not until 1918, that he claimed to have single-handedly found the skeletons and Adam's cabin at the mouth of a canyon 35 miles (56.3 km) northwest of Magdalena, New Mexico. Lewis said that everything was there, just as Adams had described, except for the gold. He said he later found out the missing gold had been found by a Magdelena Sheepherder who received $20,000 for it with which he bought a ranch in Albuquerque, New Mexico.

== Possible locations ==
For decades the Zuni Mountains were considered the most plausible location of the diggings. Thousands of prospectors, ranch-hands, and men-of-fortune searched this area and the rest of southwestern New Mexico prior to World War II, as the Adams diggings became the most sought-for gold in the country. The combination of the Great Depression and the deregulation of the gold market prompted the most unlikely people to search for the diggings. Between 1895 and 1930 several large logging communities flourished in the Zuni Mountains, several with schools and post offices; wide-gauge railroads crisscrossed the mountains. The loggers were well aware of the Adams legend, as it had become a nationally known story. Between running logs nothing was more common than prospecting except for drinking. Rumors of gold in the Zunis had become so common that the U.S. government ordered several geological expeditions in the years between World War I and World War II to verify whether this claim could be supported. The geologists found nothing. In the 1950s the area was thoroughly re-explored for uranium during the uranium boom around Grants, New Mexico. Eventually the obsession with the Zuni Mountains as a host for the Adams diggings faded. It was also around the mid-century that the popularity of the Adams legend began to diminish and the Lost Dutchman Mine became America's most sought-for lost gold mine. The Adams diggings were beginning to seem a hoax or a mine unlikely to ever be found.

Geologically, the Adams diggings could only be in the southwestern quadrant of the state. Adams himself spent most of the remainder of his life searching the areas in and around Reserve, New Mexico. This area was the largest gold producing area in the state, and hosted several small mining booms, including the rich strikes at Silver City and Pinos Altos. The areas that could conceivably host the diggings in this region (containing several large mountain ranges that remain sparsely inhabited) are numerous, as minerals and evidence of previous mining can be found throughout the area. Local folklore will tell you that the gold is at the headwaters of either the Black, the Gila or the Prieto Rivers. Spanish Lore will tell you to look to the Blue Mountains. Dozens of mining camps in this region of New Mexico were thought to be the Adams diggings for brief periods, until each proved itself to be less rich than at first indicated: egregious hopes followed by rapid disappointment. That seems to be the story of gold in the desert southwest.

The Datils and Gallinas Mountains and the basins to the north of these mountains were considered possible locations for the diggings that increased in popularity as the other locations lost appeal. Dick French, in his book Four Days from Fort Wingate, places the diggings in this area. It has become known as "Dick French’s area," although his location was known to have been found by others in the 1950s, if not earlier. A follow-on work by Dick French, Return to the Lost Adams Diggings: The Paul A. Hale Story published in 2014 uses historical, artifactual, geographical, and geological data to demonstrate the viability of the location in the new book as the locality of the Lost Adams Diggings. The new book demonstrates the presence of significant gold mineralization, adds a wrinkle to the story by presenting evidence of colonial Spanish activity in the area dated to the 1600s, and identifies and locates every critical landmark. The new book contains maps, pictures of artifacts, assay reports, and is written in a conversational format with Dick interviewing the re-discoverers Paul Hale and Ronald Schade.

A similar but geographically less plausible location was found in eastern Arizona by Don Fingado near Clifton. The site contains features described by Adams much like the area favored by Dick French; however, the gold remained undiscovered.

In some minds the gold was to be found on either the Zuni or Navajo reservations, but the laws preventing the acquisition of mineral rights in these regions have discouraged searching.

There are other sites, but the leading candidates in the popular imagination are mentioned above. If it really exists, its traditional location remains within "Apacheria" or the southwest quadrant of New Mexico and bordering areas in Arizona. The complexity of the story is detailed in Jack Purcell's definitive book on the subject, The Lost Adams Diggings: Myth, Mystery, and Madness. This work, unlike its predecessors, is a serious attempt to give historical perspective supported by cited research. Purcell believes that the gold exists and is perhaps somewhere in the mountains just south of Quemado, New Mexico. Perhaps gold will be found someday, but in the minds of most, the legend is fading away among the other items in the forgotten annals of American lore.

== Legacy ==
The many stories arising or deriving from the lost diggings have inspired many to search for lost Apache gold ever since. Its legend has supplied many folk tales, stories and books with ample fuel for fantasies of lost treasures, hidden canyons, Apache secrets and gold "somewhere out there" in the wilds. Another supposed Indian name for the mine was "Sno-Ta-Hay," which supposedly means "there it lies" i.e. the gold is on the ground and can be picked up or panned as a placer mine. Chief Nana supposedly called it that when he first warned the Adams party before the attack. As previously mentioned, J. Frank Dobie devoted half of his book "Apache Gold and Yaqui Silver" (now in its ninth printing) to the story of the Lost Adams Diggings and considered it to be the greatest "lost mine" story of US history. The amount of mail being sent to western New Mexico during the 1930s prompted the government to create a new post office in the area affectionately named "Lost Adams Diggings, NM;" the post office has since closed.

The 1963 novel MacKenna's Gold by Heck Allen is loosely based on the Adams legend. The novel was made into a film in 1969 with the title Mackenna's Gold. Numerous other books about, or based on, the diggings have been written.

The legend was dramatized on a 1991 episode of Unsolved Mysteries.
