= Silver City, Pinos Altos and Mogollon Railroad =

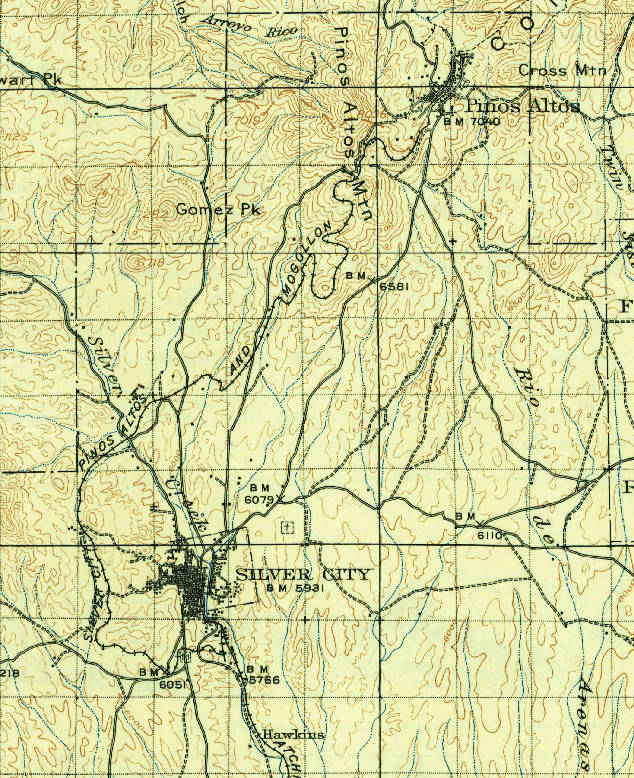
Silver City, Pinos Altos and Mogollon Railroad was a 2 ft narrow gauge railway serving copper mines along the Continental Divide

Silver City, Pinos Altos and Mogollon Railroad (SC, PA&M) was a 2 ft (610 mm) narrow gauge railway serving copper mines along the Continental Divide in the mountains of southwestern New Mexico. The communities of Silver City and Pinos Altos developed as 19th century miners recovered easily extracted gold and silver from ore deposits of the area. Standard-gauge Santa Fe Railroad reached Silver City in 1886, and SC, PA&M was incorporated 24 August 1889 to build a railway north to Mogollon, New Mexico. Construction was limited to 5 miles (8.0 km) of grading until Wisconsin-based Comanche Mining and Smelting purchased the railroad and the Pinos Altos mining claims of George Hearst in 1903 after horse-drawn ore transport became uneconomical. The Silver City smelter burned shortly after purchase, but was rebuilt with three blast furnaces and a reverberatory furnace to handle 225 tons of ore per day. Two Shay locomotives were moved to Silver City in August 1905 from the Gilpin tramway of Gilpin County, Colorado. The railroad was built through iron and limestone mines on Chloride Flat west of Silver City. The limestone was used as a flux for smelting the copper ore.

The railroad climbed 1,100 feet (340 m) using 48 bridges or trestles with 15.4 miles (24.8 km) of track at grades of 1.5 to 6 percent to cross the 6 miles (9.7 km) from Silver City to Pinos Altos. The Continental Divide summit was at an elevation of 7,311 feet (2,228 m) near Pinos Altos. Ore was carried in 33 ten-ton capacity drop-bottom hopper cars built in Silver City from riveted or bolted steel channels, angles and sheets. The railroad also built ten wooden flatcars which were modified upon occasion to serve as excursion cars, lowside gondolas, a steam-powered derrick for recovering derailed cars, a corrugated steel boxcar, and a tank car to carry boiler water for the locomotives. There was also one caboose. Two new locomotives were purchased while the older locomotives handled construction trains. When regular service was established on 4 July 1906, the newer locomotives pulled trains of nine or ten ore cars from the mines to ore concentrators and smelters in Silver City. Mining equipment was transported back to the mines in empty ore cars. No railway air brakes were fitted, and a runaway ore train derailment on 7 February 1907 killed the locomotive fireman and a visiting representative from Lima Locomotive Works. The older locomotives shunted cars around the smelters and transported slag from the smelters to disposal sites. Another larger locomotive was purchased in 1907. A 25 miles (40 km) southwesterly extension was considered to reach Burro Mountain. A 7-stall engine-house was constructed in anticipation of two more locomotives, but operations ceased on 10 October 1907 after the price of copper dropped 50 percent within a few weeks. Comanche Mining and Smelting merged with Minnesota-based Savannah Copper Company in 1908. The line operated briefly after copper prices recovered in 1910, and was scrapped in 1913.

== Locomotives ==
Number	Builder	Type	Date	Works number	Notes
1	Lima Locomotive Works	2-truck, 2-cylinder 10-ton Shay	8/1887	181	ex-Gilpin tramway #1 acquired 5/1905 scrapped 1913
2	Lima Locomotive Works	2-truck, 3-cylinder 12-ton Shay	2/1888	199	ex-Gilpin tramway #2 acquired 5/1905 to Savannah Mining Co. Utah 1913
3	Lima Locomotive Works	20-ton Shay	4/1906	1672	converted to 3-foot gauge Alta Scenic Railway #3 3 July 1917
4	Lima Locomotive Works	20-ton Shay	4/1906	1673	operated cabless following roll-over accident. Converted to 3-foot gauge Alta Scenic Railway #4 26 November 1917
5	Lima Locomotive Works	33-ton Shay	7/1907	1928	converted to 42-inch gauge Big Sandy and Cumberland Railway #5 1913
