= Navajo Lake Airport =

- IATA: none; ICAO: none; FAA LID: 1V0

Summary
- Airport type: Public
- Owner: NM Department of Transportation
- Serves: Navajo Dam
- Location: San Juan County, New Mexico
- Elevation AMSL: 6,478 ft / 1,975 m
- Coordinates: 36°48′30″N 107°39′05″W
- Interactive map of Navajo Lake Airport

Runways
Direction	Length		Surface
Direction	ft	m	Surface
6/24	5,022	1,531	Asphalt

Statistics (2022)
- Aircraft operations (year ending 4/28/2022): 200
- Source: Federal Aviation Administration

Navajo Lake Airport (FAA LID: 1V0) is a public use airport owned by the New Mexico State Highway and Transportation Department and located in San Juan County, New Mexico, United States. The airport is situated west of Navajo Lake. According to the FAA's National Plan of Integrated Airport Systems for 2009–2013, it is categorized as a general aviation facility.

== Facilities and aircraft ==
Navajo Lake Airport covers an area of 560 acres (230 ha) at an elevation of 6,478 feet (1,975 m) above mean sea level. It has one runway designated 6/24 with an asphalt surface measuring 5,022 by 60 feet (1,531 x 18 m).

For the 12-month period ending April 28, 2022, the airport had 200 general aviation aircraft operations, an average of 16 per month.
