= Springer Municipal Airport =

Airport in Springer, New Mexico, US

- IATA: none; ICAO: none; FAA LID: S42

Summary
- Airport type: Public
- Owner: Town of Springer
- Serves: Springer, New Mexico
- Elevation AMSL: 5,894 ft / 1,796 m
- Coordinates: 36°19′53″N 104°37′04″W

Map
- Location of airport in New Mexico

Runways
Direction	Length		Surface
Direction	ft	m	Surface
1/19	5,003	1,525	Asphalt

Statistics (2022)
- Aircraft operations (year ending 4/22/2022): 30
- Source: Federal Aviation Administration

Springer Municipal Airport (FAA LID: S42) is a town owned, public use airport located one nautical mile (2 km) south of the central business district of Springer, a town in Colfax County, New Mexico, United States. It is included in the National Plan of Integrated Airport Systems for 2011–2015, which categorized it as a general aviation facility.

== Facilities and aircraft ==
Springer Municipal Airport covers an area of 108 acres (44 ha) at an elevation of 5,894 feet (1,797 m) above mean sea level. It has one runway designated 1/19 with an asphalt surface measuring 5,003 by 60 feet (1,525 x 18 m).

For the 12-month period ending April 22, 2022, the airport had 30 aircraft operations, an average of 2 per month: 67% general aviation and 33% military.
