= Anita Scott Coleman =

American writer (1890–1960)

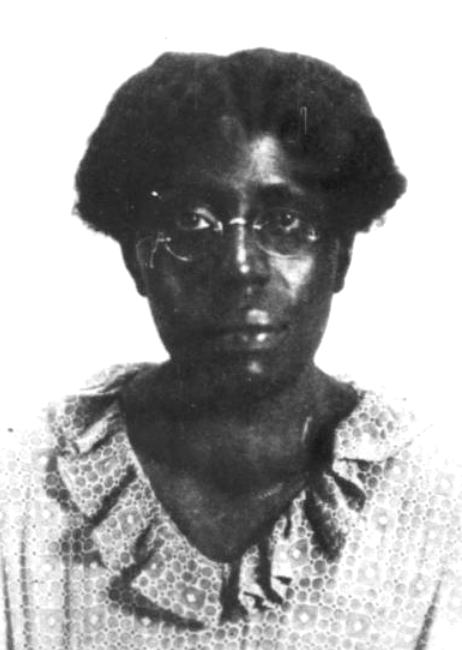
- Anita Scott Coleman, from a 1926 publication
- Born: November 27, 1890; Guaymas, Sonora, Mexico
- Died: March 27, 1960 (aged 69); Los Angeles, California, US
- Education: New Mexico Teachers College
- Occupation: Writer

Anita Scott Coleman (November 27, 1890 – March 27, 1960) was an American writer born in Mexico and raised in New Mexico. She wrote dozens of short stories, poems, silent film scenarios, and also wrote books such as the children's book The Singing Bells (1961) and a novel called Unfinished Masterpiece. Her stories and essays were published in national Black outlets including Opportunity, Half-Century Magazine, The Messenger, The Crisis, and The Pittsburgh Courier.

== Early life ==
Anita Scott was born in Guaymas, Sonora, Mexico, in 1890, the daughter of William Henry Scott and Mary Ann Stokes Scott. Her parents were American; her father was a Buffalo Soldier from Virginia, and her mother was a laundry worker, born under slavery in Florida. She was raised on a ranch near Silver City, New Mexico, where her father worked for the railroad. She trained as a teacher at the New Mexico Teachers College, graduating in 1909.

== Career ==
Coleman wrote dozens of short stories, poems, silent film scenarios, and a children's book, The Singing Bells (1961). She also wrote a novel, Unfinished Masterpiece. Her poetry was published in the volumes Small Wisdom (1937) and Reason for Singing (1948). Her poems were also included in Negro Voices (1938) and Ebony Rhythm (1948). Her stories and essays were published in national Black outlets including Opportunity, Half-Century Magazine, The Messenger, The Crisis, and The Pittsburgh Courier, between 1919 and 1943. Scholarly interest in her works has grown in recent years, positioning her as a Western response to the Harlem Renaissance, and as an Afro-Latinx writer.

She moved to Los Angeles, California, with her husband and children in 1926, and managed a boarding house. She won awards for her writing from The Crisis and from the Robert Browning Poetry Contest. In 1946, she was appointed chair of the YWCA advisory board at the University of Southern California.

== Personal life and legacy ==
In 1916, Anita Scott married James Harold Coleman, a photographer and printer. They had five children born between 1917 and 1928; daughters Willianna and Mary were also poets as young women. Coleman died in Los Angeles in 1960. Two collections of her writing were published in 2008, by Texas Tech University Press, and the University of Oklahoma Press. Her grandson Douglas Jackson, a professor at Elizabeth City State University, has given presentations about her life.

There is a state historic marker about Coleman near the Silver City Visitor Center in Grant County, New Mexico, dedicated in 2015.
