= Battle of Pinos Altos =

1861 attack during the Apache Wars in Arizona

Coordinates: 32.86726°N 108.21980°W

- Part of the American Civil War; Apache Wars
| Date | September 27, 1861 |
| Location | Pinos Altos, Confederate Arizona; Modern Day: Gila Wilderness, Grant County, New Mexico |
| Result | Confederate victory |

Belligerents
| (Confederate States of America) Confederate States | Apache |

Commanders and leaders
| (Confederate States of America) Thomas J. Mastin † (Confederate States of America) Jack Swilling | Mangas Coloradas; Cochise |

Strength
| ~15 militia 1 artillery piece | ~300 warriors |

Casualties and losses
| 7 killed 7 wounded | ~10 killed ~20 wounded |

The Battle of Pinos Altos was a military action of the Apache Wars. It was fought on September 27, 1861, between settlers of Pinos Altos mining town, the Confederate Arizona Guards, and Apache warriors. The town is located about seven miles north of the present day Silver City, New Mexico.

== Background ==
The conflict between the Confederates and Apaches was at its height in September 1861. Since the 1860 discovery of gold in the nearby Pinos Altos Mountains, thousands of white settlers had flocked to the region. This infuriated the Apache chiefs Mangas Coloradas and (after the Bascom affair) Cochise, who by 1861 had formed an alliance with each other and vowed to destroy all of the Americans and Mexicans encroaching on their land.

Apaches attacked several towns, killing many settlers. Pinos Altos, being one of the major mining towns in the area, formed its own two militia companies for garrison duty. The first company under Captain Thomas J. Mastin called themselves the "Arizona Guards"; the other under Captain William Markt, called themselves the "Minute Men". The founder of Phoenix, Jack Swilling was a first lieutenant of the Arizona Guards, he is believed to have fought in the Pinos Altos engagement. One of the soldiers of the company engaged was James Henry Tevis. Most of the Arizona Guards were settlers and miners from around Pinos Altos and the Mimbres River valley or other parts of southern New Mexico Territory who had joined to protect their lives and property from the escalating conflict with the Mimbreños.

When the provisional Arizona Territory was annexed to the Confederacy after Lt. Colonel John Baylor occupied Mesilla in July 1861, the militia companies were mustered into the Confederate Army. Half of the Minute Men deserted just after their induction, and the remaining were poorly equipped. This meant the Arizona Guards had to provide most of the protection for the Pinos Altos miners.

== Battle ==
The combined force of Mangas Coloradas and Cochise numbered well over 300 strong when they turned their attention to Pinos Altos in the early morning of September 27, 1861. The Apaches hoped to achieve another victory as they had had at Tubac and had attempted at Placito. The natives attacked simultaneously the nearby mining camp as well as the town.

The assault completely surprised the town's population. Many miners at their camp were trapped in their diggings and subsequently killed. Some survivors stayed underground, too afraid to venture out, thus contributing nothing to the town's defense. Two forces of the Arizona Guards were on patrol when the Apaches attacked; Mastin commanded one while the other portion patrolled elsewhere. Apache forces first attempted to burn several log cabins which ran along the perimeter of the settlement: this failed, and the natives were repulsed.

Mastin's squad of fifteen men arrived back at the town not long after hostilities began, while the other portion was still on patrol. Mastin ordered his men, the remnants of the Minute Men, and the town's civilian defenders to take up defensive positions in the center of the settlement. For a while the two sides fought at medium to long range until the Apaches launched a full attack around 12:00 noon, leading to hand-to-hand combat. Captain Mastin realized something must be done to aid his overwhelmed militiamen, so he ordered the old cannon to be loaded with nails and buckshot, as there were no cannonballs available. The gun was wheeled into the defenders' position and fired on the wave of oncoming Apache warriors, and many fell, dead or wounded. The Apaches decided to cease their effort and began to retreat. The Arizona Guards mounted their horses and gave chase, and civilians fired muskets from their house windows. The engagement was over by 1:00 pm, and the Apaches fled to the Gila River or to Mexico.

== Aftermath ==
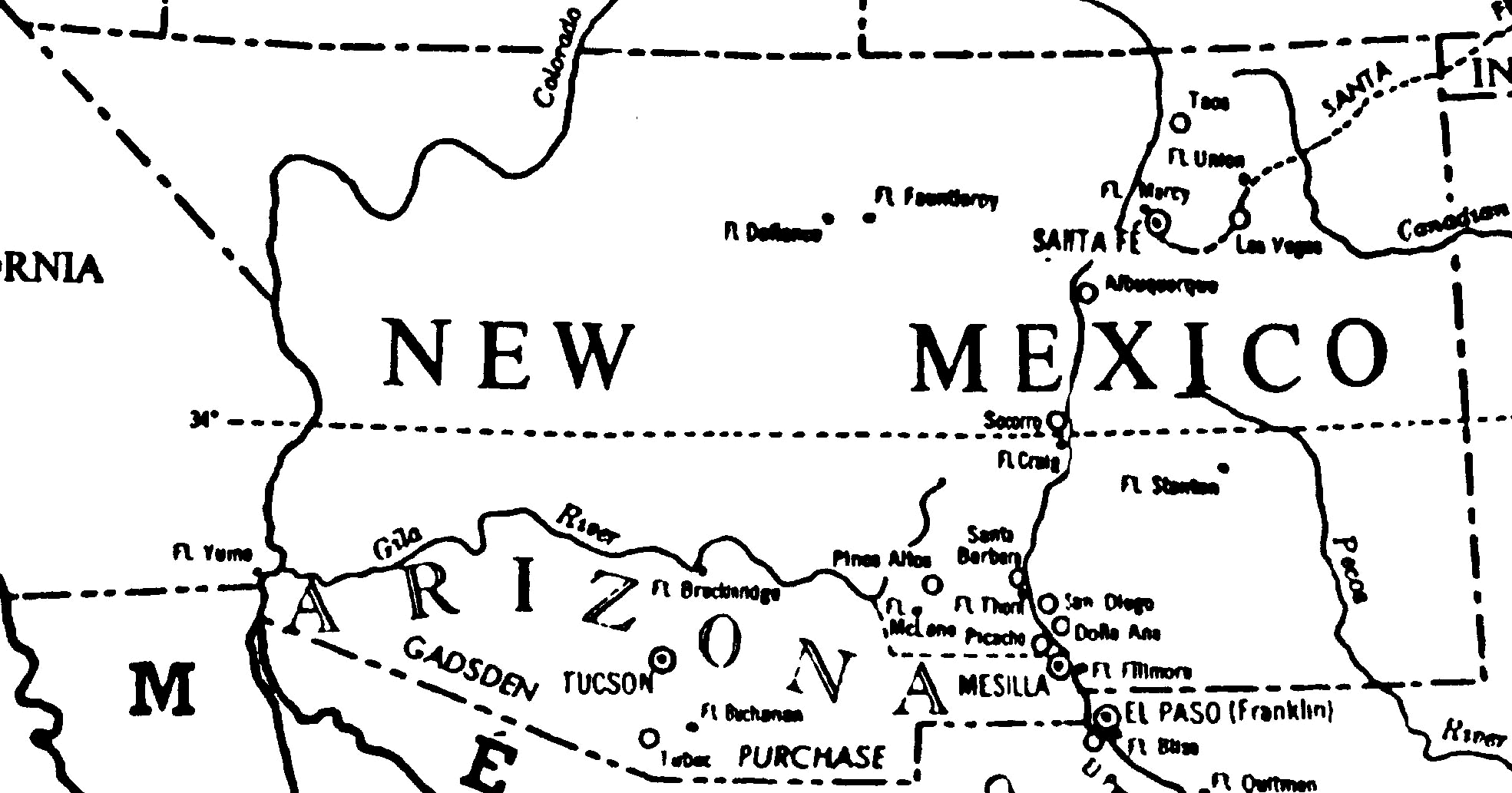
Map of the traditional boundaries of Arizona and the later Confederate Arizona south of the 34 parallel.

Within the last half-hour of the battle, Captain Thomas Mastin managed to turn an almost certain defeat into victory with his simple order to bring up the old cannon. At least ten Apaches were killed and left on the battlefield after the natives had retreated. Over 20 dead and wounded were picked up and dragged away by the Apaches, according to Confederate accounts. Captain Mastin was mortally wounded, sometime while leading the cavalry charge that decided the battle; he died a few days later at Pinos Altos. Other accounts say Mastin was killed by an Apache bullet, before the cannon was ever in use. Five Confederates were killed, including Mastin; seven other settlers or militiamen were severely wounded. Command of the Arizona guards passed to Lieutenant Thomas Helm.

Apache tactics changed at this point, other than at the Apache Pass engagement, Apaches ceased massing in large numbers and continued their cause by means of guerrilla warfare. They stopped attacking well defended settlements. Instead, they continued attacking mining camps and smaller isolated communities. Captain Peter Hardeman of the 2nd Texas Mounted Rifles with 25 men were near Pinos Altos immediately after the Apaches retreated. Hardeman's troop came across the Apache trail and tracked them for days, all the way to the Gila River before turning back because their rations were running low. Confederate forces chased Apaches into Mexico several times in 1861 and 1862. The Arizona Guards penetrated as far as Lake Guzman in Chihuahua, without ever catching the elusive natives.

As for Pinos Altos, most of the settlers ended their stay at the camp. Despite their victory, many were afraid the Chiricahua would attack again. On October 8, a distress message was sent from the miners of Pinos Altos, so 100 men were sent to reinforce the Arizona Guards, the largest Confederate force ever sent to relieve a town threatened by natives. The Apaches never attacked again so the reinforcing company was withdrawn. Only about 70 miners remained in Pinos Altos after the battle, the Arizona Guards continued their garrison duty.

== See also ==
- New Mexico campaign
