= Mackenna's Gold =

1969 film by J. Lee Thompson

- Theatrical release poster by Howard Terpning
- Directed by: J. Lee Thompson
- Screenplay by: Carl Foreman
- Based on: Mackenna's Gold; 1963 novel by Will Henry
- Produced by: Carl Foreman; Dimitri Tiomkin
- Starring: Gregory Peck; Omar Sharif; Telly Savalas; Camilla Sparv; Keenan Wynn; Julie Newmar
- Narrated by: Victor Jory
- Cinematography: Joseph MacDonald
- Edited by: Bill Lenny
- Music by: Quincy Jones
- Color process: Technicolor
- Production companies: Highroad Productions, Inc.
- Distributed by: Columbia Pictures
- Release dates: March 18, 1969 (Premiere); May 10, 1969 (Phoenix)
- Running time: 128 minutes
- Country: United States
- Language: English
- Budget: $7 million
- Box office: $41 million (est.)

Mackenna's Gold is a 1969 American Western film directed by J. Lee Thompson, starring an ensemble cast featuring Gregory Peck, Omar Sharif, Telly Savalas, Ted Cassidy, Camilla Sparv and Julie Newmar in lead roles. It was photographed in Super Panavision 70 and Technicolor by Joseph MacDonald, with original music by Quincy Jones.

Mackenna's Gold is based on the novel of the same name by Heck Allen using the pen name Will Henry, telling the story of how the lure of gold corrupts a diverse group of people. The novel was loosely based on the legend of the Lost Adams Diggings, crediting the Frank Dobie account of the legend (Apache Gold and Yaqui Silver) in the author's note. The film was a box-office failure in North America, but went on to become a major success in the Soviet Union and the Indian subcontinent.

== Plot ==
An old legend tells of a fortune in gold hidden in the "Cañon del Oro" ("Canyon of Gold"), later called the "Lost Adams", guarded by Apache spirits. A man named Adams is said to have found it when he was young, only to have the Apaches capture and blind him. Years later, Marshal MacKenna is ambushed by Prairie Dog, an old Apache shaman, and is forced to kill him. MacKenna thereby comes into possession of a map to the treasure. He examines and commits it to his memory before burning it.

While being tracked by the US Cavalry, Mexican outlaw John Colorado and his gang look for Prairie Dog to get the map. They take shelter in the house of an old judge in Hadleyburg, kill him, and kidnap his daughter, Inga. Colorado then captures MacKenna, intending to force him to lead them to the gold. The gang includes Colorado's right-hand man Sanchez and several Indians, among them Apache warrior Hachita and Apache woman Hesh-ke. Hesh-ke and MacKenna were once lovers, but she rejected him after he arrested her brother, who was tried and hanged.

Ben Baker, a gambler who knows Colorado, arrives with townsmen who have learned about Colorado's plans when one of the latter's men got drunk in town and said too much. Colorado is forced to allow them to join his party. The townsmen include the blind Adams himself. MacKenna warns them to return home, that they will get themselves killed searching for gold that does not exist, but Colorado reveals what happened to Prairie Dog, and they stay.

The cavalry, led by Sergeant Tibbs, ambushes the party at a water hole, and most of the gang is killed. Several survivors are hunted down by the Apaches. The remaining gold hunters (Colorado, Hachita, Hesh-ke, with Mackenna and Inga) continue on their way, while MacKenna and Inga begin to fall in love. A jealous Hesh-Ke now wants MacKenna back.

When the cavalry patrol is whittled down to just Tibbs and two others, Tibbs kills them and joins the gang. After a shoot-out with the Apaches, they reach "Shaking Rock", a feature on the map. According to MacKenna, they will see the canyon the next morning. Mackenna says that he wants his guns and the girl and if there is no gold he still expects that Colorado will keep his word. Colorado reveals that he is not going to waste his share of the gold in bars and clubs but shows Mackenna a copy of the magazine La Vie Parisienne (Note: More specifically, the 1872 edition.) and Mackenna realizes that Colorado's ambition is to live as a millionaire in Paris. He warns Inga to be alert for any opportunity to escape. When Inga protests that she too wants some gold, he tells her there is no gold, that he has been bluffing.

The next morning, when the first sunlight shines down, the shadow of the pinnacle of "Shaking Rock" starts to move and eventually points to a hidden passageway. On the other side, they see below them a vein of gold in the canyon wall opposite. As everyone races to it, Hesh-ke tries to kill Inga, who fights back, making Hesh-ke fall to her death. MacKenna, suspecting that Colorado does not intend to leave anybody else alive, tries to escape with Inga up the canyon wall. Tibbs is killed by Hachita. Colorado then pulls his gun on Hachita, only to find that it is unloaded. Hachita removed the bullets, as the spirits had told him to do, but turns his back on Colorado, who kills him with a knife.

Colorado pursues MacKenna and Inga, catching up to them at an abandoned Native American dwelling up the cliff. They fight, but are interrupted when Apaches enter the canyon. Their shouts and the pounding of their horses trigger a rockfall which causes the valley floor to buckle and quake. The Apaches flee. The three survivors descend the cliff and ride away, escaping the collapse of the canyon walls, which buries the gold beyond reach.

Colorado warns MacKenna to stay away from him, but MacKenna tells him that he will be coming after him. MacKenna and Inga ride off together, unaware that the saddle bags of the horse MacKenna is riding are stuffed with gold nuggets.

== Cast ==
- Gregory Peck as Marshal Sam MacKenna
- Omar Sharif as John Colorado
- Telly Savalas as Sergeant Tibbs
- Camilla Sparv as Inga Bergemann
- Keenan Wynn as Sanchez
- Julie Newmar as Hesh-Ke
- Ted Cassidy as Hachita
- Lee J. Cobb as The Editor
- Raymond Massey as The Preacher
- Burgess Meredith as The Storekeeper
- Anthony Quayle as Older Englishman
- Edward G. Robinson as Old Adams
- Eli Wallach as Ben Baker
- Eduardo Ciannelli as Prairie Dog
- Dick Peabody as Avila
- Rudy Diaz as Besh
- Robert Phillips as Monkey
- Shelley Morrison as The Pima Squaw
- Trevor Bardette as Judge Bergeman
- Victor Jory as the Narrator

== Original novel ==
The film was based on a novel by Will Henry (pseud. of Heck Allen) which was published in 1963. The novel was based on the legend of the Lost Adams Diggings. According to the legend, a teamster named Adams and some prospectors in Arizona were approached by a Native American-raised Mexican named Gotch Ear, who offered to show them a canyon filled with gold. However, in the novel as well as the film, the gang abducts a Marshal named MacKenna to find a way to the Canyon.

The film also adapts elements from another work, Apache Gold and Yaqui Silver (1939) by J. Frank Dobie, a collection of tales about the fabulous treasures of the Southwest, based on the legend of the "Lost Adams Diggins".

=== Title ===
Although Allen's novel title and hero shared the same spelling of the name "Mackenna", and the film's title according to the studio is "Mackenna's Gold", Peck's character is listed in publicity materials as "MacKenna".

== Development ==
Film rights were purchased by Highroad Productions, the company of writer-producer Carl Foreman, who had a deal with Columbia. It was Foreman's first Western since High Noon.

"I feel we should all do a Western from time to time", said Foreman. "It's the gym, the workout for basic cinema. In a sense this one bears a relationship with High Noon; it's roughly about the same town 10 or 15 years later and... [the lead role is] Gary Cooper's successor. High Noon never left town. This one never comes in but the town impinges on the story."

In April 1965, it was announced that composer Dimitri Tiomkin had joined the company as producer and his first project for the company would be Mackenna's Gold. Tiomkin would also do the music. "It was practical appreciation of my efforts", said Tiomkin, who had known Foreman since they served together in the Signal Corps during the war.

In October 1966, Foreman announced he wanted to make the film in the US, where he had not made a movie for almost fifteen years. He originally believed that he would have to make the movie in Spain where it could be done for below the line costs of $2.2 million, while a USA shoot would cost $3.2 million. However, on further research, Foreman felt a US shoot would cost only 10% more than a foreign one. He was persuaded to make the movie in America to use the Grand Canyon. (The budget would eventually rise to $7 million.)

In January 1967, it was announced the film would be shot in Cinerama. Columbia provided the finance and J. Lee Thompson would direct. "I've always wanted to do an American Western", said Thompson. "We're taking a big new approach to this one, striving for an over-all presentation, rightly or wrongly, that will appear new – techniques that may now be acceptable when applied to the big screen."

Thompson later called the film "sheer adventure in six-track stereo sound. Absolutely without any 'other dimension'."

=== Casting ===
The first star signed was Omar Sharif, whose casting was announced in February 1967. His fee was $400,000. Sharif said in an Italian interview that he would make this movie for his son, who was more impressed by action films but disapproved of Sharif's string of romantic epics during this part of his career.

Thompson's first choice for the role of MacKenna was Clint Eastwood, who was looking to make an American Western film after his success with the Dollars trilogy. He disliked the script and turned down the movie to play the lead role in Hang 'Em High (1968). Steve McQueen was also considered for the lead role.

A script was sent to Richard Burton who called it "a standard western script... Christ, what a lot of rubbish one reads."

Gregory Peck's casting was announced in March. He had worked with Thompson and Foreman on The Guns of Navarone. Zero Mostel was going to play a role but had to pull out due to a scheduling clash with The Producers.

Julie Newmar signed a long-term deal with Highroad Productions as part of her casting.

Raymond Massey was the last major cast member to join the film.

"This is contemporary without being tricky", said Foreman.

== Shooting ==
Filming started May 16, 1967 on location in Oregon.

The plan was to show it in single lens Cinerama with reserved seat roadshow engagements. Columbia eventually pulled the plug on that idea, and Mackenna's Gold was drastically cut down immediately prior to its release, from nearly three hours (plus an intermission) to just over two hours.

Although most of Mackenna's Gold was photographed on 65mm stock, a handful of scenes were filmed in 35mm anamorphic.

=== Locations and props ===
Zuñi Mountains were the locations of digging according to the legend, but the film was shot mainly at Glen Canyon of Utah and Canyon de Chelly of Arizona, specifically Spider Rock. Parts of the film were also shot at Kanab Canyon, Paria, Sink Valley, and the Panguitch Fish Hatchery in Utah as well as Medford, Oregon. In the climax scenes, as the sun rises, the shadow of "Shaking Rock" grows longer. In reality, shadows become shorter as the sun rises higher.

The "Old Turkey Buzzard" theme song sequence was shot at Bryce Canyon in Utah and Monument Valley, on the Arizona-Utah border. The bird is actually a King vulture rather than a turkey vulture (buzzard).

Stock footage was used for the waterfall peril in the rafting scene. It is actually High Force on the River Tees in the northeast of England.

Stills from the scene of Julie Newmar swimming naked in the film were reprinted in Playboy magazine.

=== Film school student: George Lucas ===
Foreman allowed four film school graduates – two from USC, two from UCLA – to come on location and make their own short film on or around the shooting of Mackenna's Gold. The filmmakers were Chuck Braverman, who did a documentary on Foreman; George Lucas, who made the short film 6-18-67; David MacDougal, who made a documentary on Thompson; and J. David Wyles, who made a film on the wranglers. Lucas' movie was originally intended to be a making-of documentary.

Lucas felt the films were a ruse by Foreman to get some "cheap, behind the scenes documentary films made" but did it for the chance to direct. His project was supervised by Saul Bass. He was appalled by what he felt was a waste of money on location. Foreman reportedly hated Lucas' short film but was forced to say he liked it in a PBS documentary being made about the project. The film went on to earn a number of awards.

== Musical score and soundtrack ==
Mackenna's Gold

Soundtrack album by Quincy Jones
- Released: 1969
- Recorded: 1969
- Genre: Film score
- Length: 37:37
- Labels: RCA Victor; ABCS-OC-7
- Producer: Quincy Jones

Quincy Jones chronology
For Love of Ivy (1968)	Mackenna's Gold (1969)	The Italian Job (1969)

The original score and songs of the film were composed and conducted by Quincy Jones, and the soundtrack album was released on the RCA Victor label in 1969. The opening song, "Old Turkey Buzzard", is a recurring background theme. It was sung by José Feliciano and was composed by Quincy Jones with lyrics by Freddie Douglas. 'Freddie Douglas' was a pseudonym for writer/producer Carl Foreman. José Feliciano also plays guitar and adds vocals in many parts of the soundtrack and Spanish version of the theme song "Viejo Butre" for the Spanish-language edition of the movie.

The theme song was used on the Late Show with David Letterman in 2007 as a random running gag. A 13-second clip would be played after Letterman threw his blue index cards through the "glass" window behind his desk, and was often combined with a video clip of the turkey buzzard soaring in the sky during the movie's opening sequence. Letterman would gradually show increased mock irritation with the clip in discussions with bandleader Paul Shaffer, while at the same time calling it "exciting, moving, inspirational" and "stirring, haunting, beautiful". The running gag ultimately resulted in Feliciano making a guest appearance on the Late Show on October 16, 2007, singing a longer version of the song (with the buzzard video clip superimposed over him).

=== Track listing ===
All compositions by Quincy Jones

Track listing
No.	Title	Length
1.	"Overture"	4:36
2.	"Old Turkey Buzzard"	2:46
3.	"Canon del Oro"	5:13
4.	"Waterhole Trek"	2:37
5.	"Reve Parisien"	2:40
6.	"Old Turkey Buzzard (Instrumental version)"	2:30
7.	"Soul Full o Gold"	2:40
8.	"Main Title"	3:00
9.	"Apache Camp"	4:36
10.	"Massacre Montage"	2:42
11.	"Old Turkey Buzzard (Spanish version)"	1:30
12.	"Finale"	2:47
Total length:		37:37

=== Personnel ===
- Orchestrations by Leo Shuken, Jack Hayes, and Hal Mooney. Unidentified orchestra conducted by Quincy Jones including
  - José Feliciano − vocals, guitar
  - Bud Shank, Ethmer Roten − reeds
  - Carol Kaye − electric bass
  - Ray Brown, Jimmy Bond, Al McKibbon, Buster Williams − double bass
  - Dennis Budimir − guitar
  - Emil Richards, Shelly Manne, Milt Holland, Larry Bunker, Lou Singer, Victor Feldman, Louie Bellson, Paul Humphrey − percussion

== Release ==
The film had its world premiere in Munich, West Germany on March 18, 1969. It opened in Phoenix, Arizona on May 10, 1969.

== Reception ==
=== Critical response ===
The film was not well received by critics and audiences in North America. Mackenna's Gold was reviewed in The New York Times by Vincent Canby, who considered the film an example of "stunning absurdity". He noted: "The structure of the movie is so loose that a narrator (Victor Jory) must be employed from time to time to explain the plot, as if it were a serial. Most surprising in a movie that obviously cost a good deal of money is the sloppy matching of exterior and studio photography with miniature work for special effects." Gregory Peck did not like the film, saying: "Mackenna's Gold was a terrible western. Just wretched."

=== Box office ===
In the United States and Canada, the film earned $3.1 million in theatrical rentals. This was equivalent to estimated box office gross receipts of approximately $10 million. The film sold approximately 7,007,000 tickets at the US box office. It was a box-office failure in North America. Despite this, the film went on to become a major success in the Soviet Union and the Indian subcontinent. In France, it was the 31st top-grossing film of 1969, selling 1,288,609 tickets, which is equivalent to an estimated 4,303,954 F ($876,254). (Note: See Box office § Average ticket price.)

The film was popular in the Soviet Union. Mackenna's Gold was first shown at the VIII Moscow International Film Festival in 1973, followed by a cinematic premiere in 1974. The film was viewed by 63 million people and stands fourth in the all-time rankings of foreign film distribution in the Soviet Union. The title song "Old Turkey Buzzard" was dubbed with Russian lyrics by Leonid Derbenyov, a Russian poet and lyricist widely regarded as one of the stalwarts of 20th-century Soviet and Russian pop music. It was performed by then-popular Soviet singer Valery Obodzinsky. The film's 63 million ticket sales were equivalent to an estimated $30 million. Combined, the film grossed an estimated $40,876,254 from approximately 71,295,609 ticket sales in North America, France and the Soviet Union.

Mackenna's Gold was and remains a very successful film in India. It remained the top Hollywood grosser in India, until blockbusters like Jurassic Park (1993) and Titanic (1997) came along. Even worldwide hits such as Jaws (1975) and Star Wars (1977) would not make as much money in India as Mackenna's Gold did. The film went through countless re-runs well into the 1980s and could be seen in cinema halls across India, including small venues in the medium-size towns of North and South India.

=== Awards ===
Quincy Jones was nominated for a Grammy Award for best original score written for a motion picture or a television special.

== See also ==
- List of American films of 1969
