= Whiskey Creek Airport =

- IATA: none; ICAO: none; FAA LID: 94E

Summary
- Airport type: Public
- Owner: 94 Echo LLC
- Serves: Silver City, New Mexico
- Elevation AMSL: 6,126 ft / 1,867 m
- Coordinates: 32°45′43″N 108°12′30″W
- Interactive map of Whiskey Creek Airport

Runways
Direction	Length		Surface
Direction	ft	m	Surface
17/35	5,400	1,646	Asphalt

Statistics (2023)
- Aircraft operations (year ending 4/6/2023): 1,100
- Based aircraft: 16
- Source: Federal Aviation Administration

Whiskey Creek Airport (FAA LID: 94E) is a public use airport located four nautical miles (7 km) east of the central business district of Silver City, in Grant County, New Mexico, United States.

== Facilities and aircraft ==
Whiskey Creek Airport covers an area of 69 acres (28 ha) at an elevation of 6,126 feet (1,867 m) above mean sea level. It has one runway designated 17/35 with an asphalt surface measuring 5,400 by 50 feet (1,646 x 15 m).

For the 12-month period ending April 6, 2023, the airport had 1,100 aircraft operations, an average of 21 per week: 100% general aviation. At that time there were 16 aircraft based at this airport: 12 single-engine, 3 multi-engine and 1 helicopter.
