= Silver City, New Mexico =

- Town
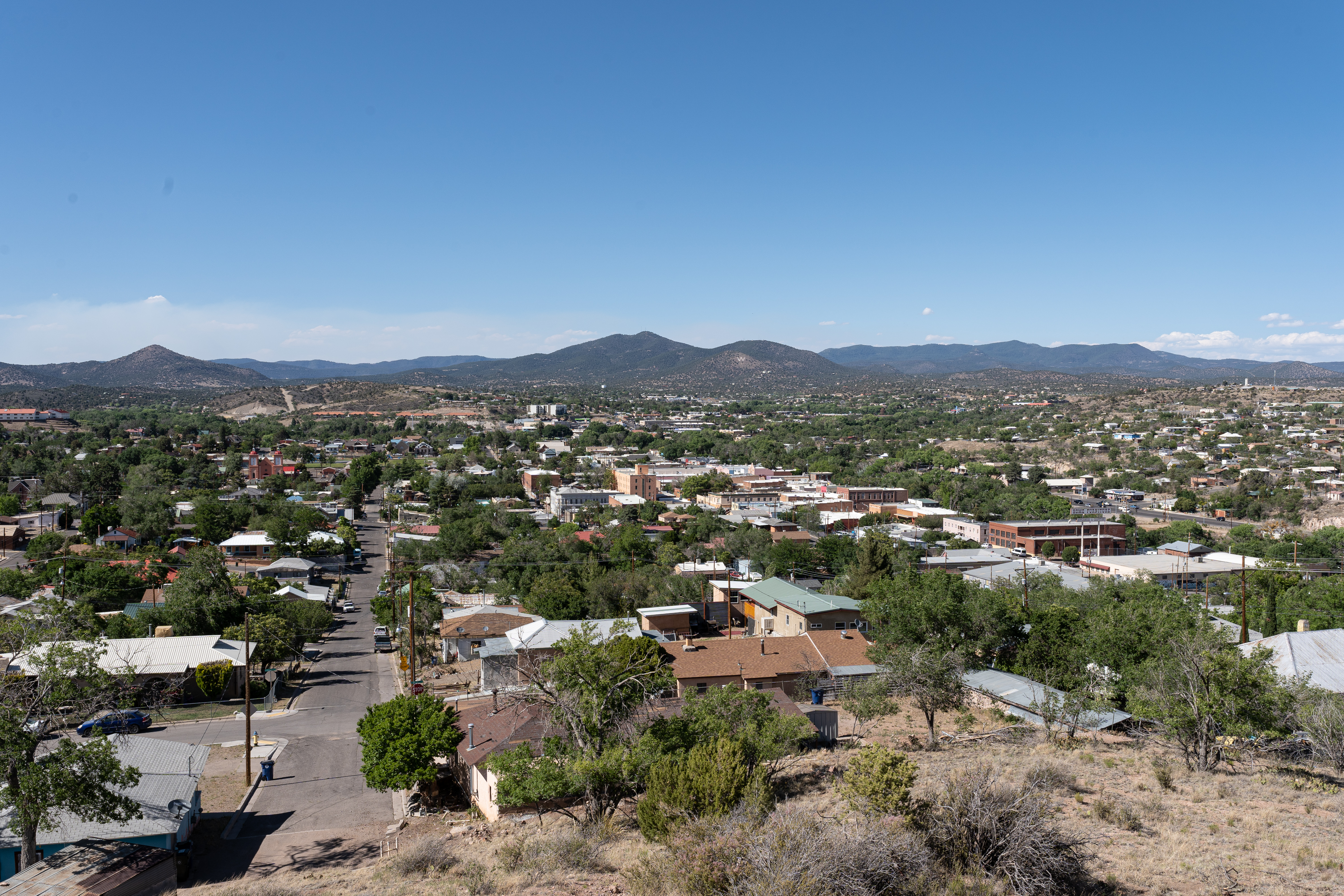
- Downtown and the surrounding area as viewed from La Capilla Heritage Park

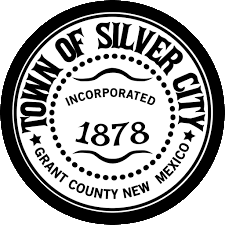
- Seal

- Location in the State of New Mexico

- Location in New Mexico Location in the United States
- Coordinates: 32°46′42″N 108°16′11″W
- Country: United States
- State: New Mexico
- County: Grant
- Incorporated: January 14, 1876

Government
  - Type: Council-Manager
  - Mayor: Ken Ladner

Area
  - Total: 10.14 sq mi (26.26 km^{2})
  - Land: 10.12 sq mi (26.21 km^{2})
  - Water: 0.019 sq mi (0.05 km^{2})
- Elevation: 5,919 ft (1,804 m)

Population (2020)
  - Total: 9,704
  - Density: 958.9/sq mi (370.2/km^{2})
- Time zone: UTC−07:00 (MST)
  - Summer (DST): UTC−06:00 (MDT)
- ZIP Codes: 88061-88062
- Area code: 575
- FIPS code: 35-73260
- GNIS feature ID: 2413285
- Website: townofsilvercity.org

Silver City is a town in Grant County, New Mexico, United States. It is the county seat and the home of Western New Mexico University. As of the 2010 census the population was 10,315. As of the 2020 census, the population was 9,704.

== History ==
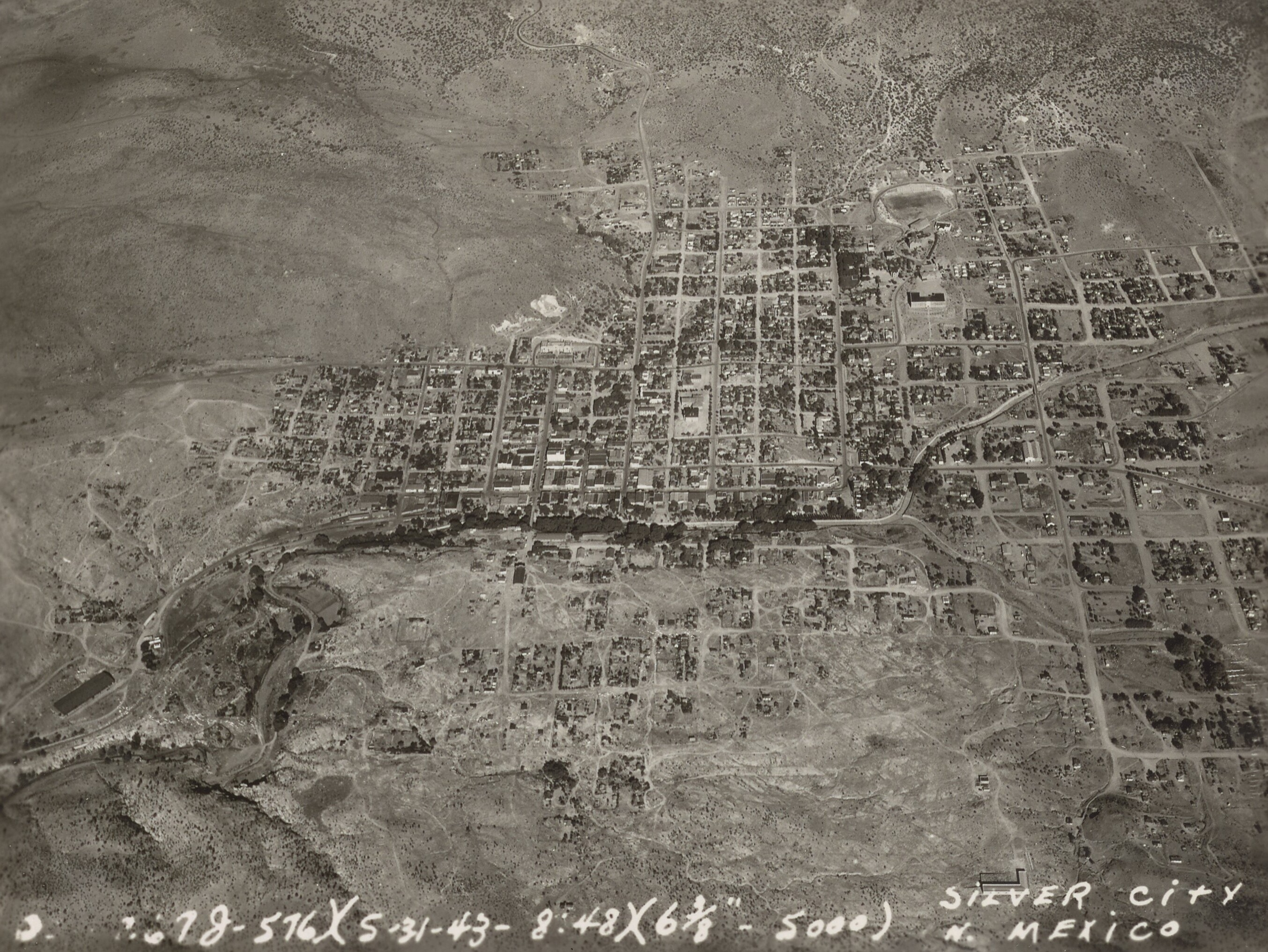
Aerial view of Silver City, 1943

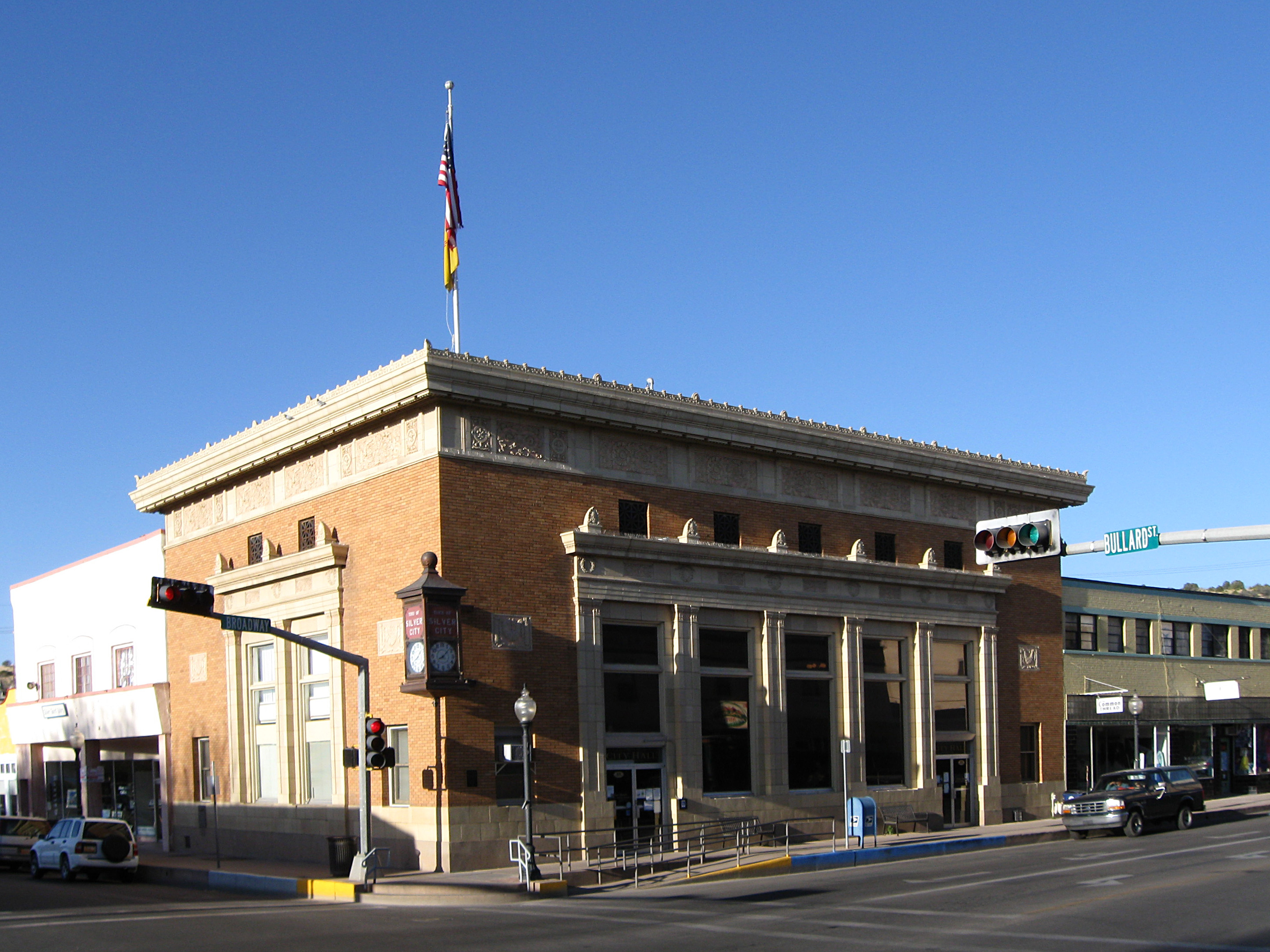
Silver City's City Hall.

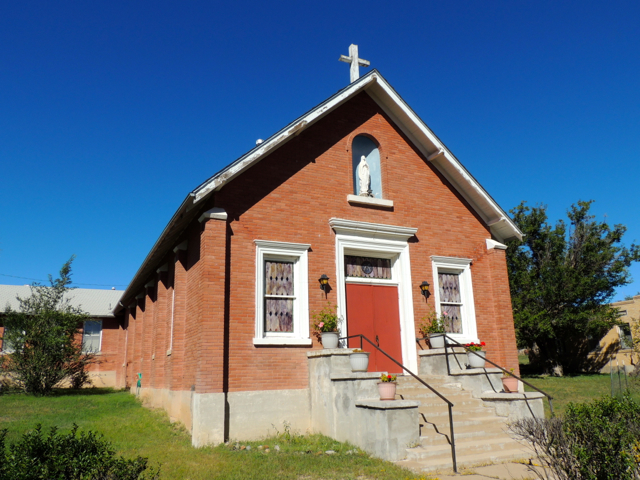
St. Mary's Church, listed on the National Register of Historic Places.

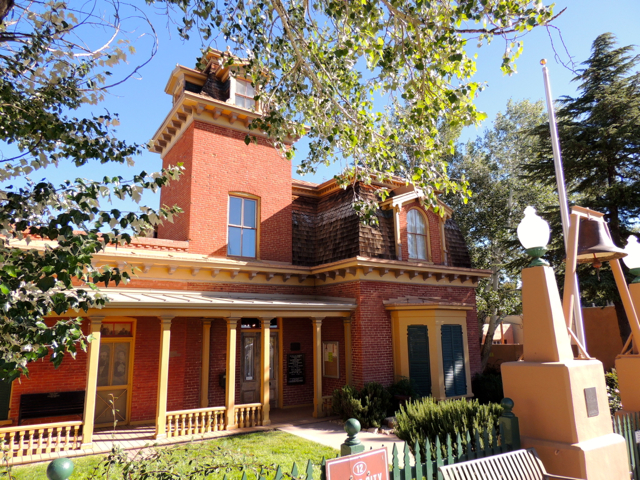
H.B. Ailman House, a historic home now used as the Silver City Municipal Museum

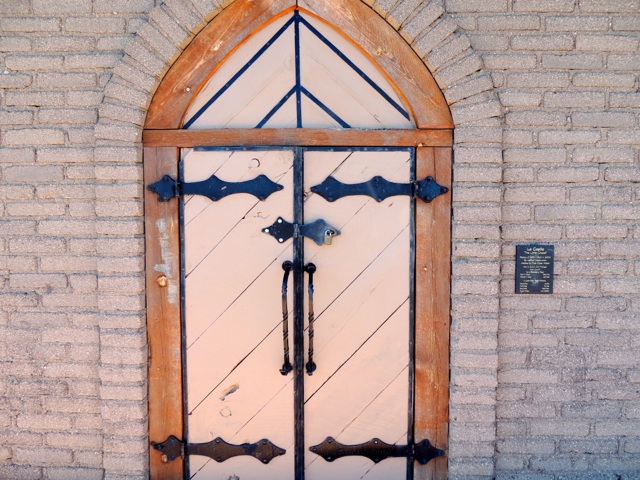
Doors to La Capilla Chapel, in the Chihuahua Hill Historic District.

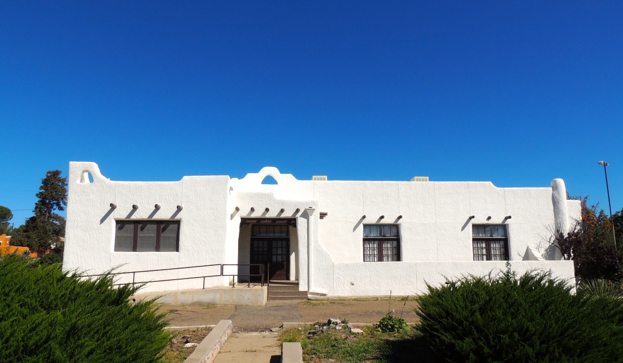
The Silver City Woman's Club – building on the NRHP.

The valley that is now the site of Silver City once served as an Apache campsite. With the arrival of the Spaniards, the area became known for its copper mining. The Apaches occupied areas in the vicinity of Silver City beginning in the late 1500s to early 1600s, based on archaeological evidence.

=== Founding of town ===
After the American Civil War, a settlement developed and became known as "La Ciénega de San Vicente" (the Oasis of St. Vincent). With a wave of American prospectors, the pace of change increased, and Silver City was founded in the summer of 1870. The founding of the town occurred shortly after the discovery of silver ore deposits at Chloride Flat, on the hill just west of the farm of Captain John M. Bullard and his brother James. Following the silver strike, Captain Bullard laid out the streets of Silver City, and a bustling tent city quickly sprang to life. Although the trajectory of Silver City's development was to be different from the hundreds of other mining boom towns established during the same period, Captain Bullard himself never lived to see even the beginnings of permanence, as he was killed in a confrontation with Apache less than a year later, on February 23, 1871.

=== Gun fighting ===
The town's violent crime rate was substantial during the 1870s. However, Grant County Sheriff Harvey Whitehill was elected in 1874, and gained a sizable reputation for his abilities at controlling trouble. In 1875, Whitehill became the first lawman to arrest Billy the Kid, known at the time under the alias of Henry Antrim. Whitehill arrested him twice, both times for theft in Silver City (Sheriff Whitehill testified to the Justice of the Peace that he believed Henry Antrim did not do the actual stealing the second time arrested, but assisted in the hiding of the property stolen by Sombrero Jack). Whitehill would later claim that the young man was a likeable kid, whose stealing was a result more of necessity than criminal. His mother is buried in the town cemetery. In 1878, the town hired its first town marshal, "Dangerous Dan" Tucker, who had been working as a deputy for Whitehill since 1875. Butch Cassidy and his Wild Bunch were also reported to frequent the Silver City saloons in the late 1800s.

Mrs. Lettie B. Morrill, in a talk given to the Daughters of the American Revolution chapter in Silver City on September 19, 1908, stated, "John Bullard was placed in the first grave dug in Silver City, having been killed while punishing the Indians for an attack upon the new town; the brothers were prospectors about the country for many years. The last one left for the old home about 1885, saying, 'It is only a matter of time until the Indians get me if I stay here.'" Silver City was also the starting point for many expeditions hunting for treasures, such as the Lost Adams Diggings.

=== Mining and rail development ===
The communities of Silver City and Pinos Altos developed as 19th century miners recovered easily extracted copper, gold and silver from ore deposits of the area. Standard-gauge Santa Fe Railroad reached Silver City in 1886, and Silver City, Pinos Altos and Mogollon Railroad was incorporated in 1889 to build a railway north to Mogollon. Construction was limited to 5 miles (8.0 km) of grading until Wisconsin-based Comanche Mining and Smelting purchased the railroad in 1903 after horse-drawn ore transport became uneconomical. The Silver City smelter burned shortly after purchase, but was rebuilt with three blast furnaces and a reverberatory furnace to handle 225 tons of ore per day. Regular SC, PA&M steam service was briefly running from 1907 to 1913.

=== New Mexico Western State Teachers College ===
In 1893, New Mexico Normal School was established. It was later known as New Mexico Western State Teachers College. In 1963, it was renamed Western New Mexico University. Today, WNMU offers eight graduate degrees, 41 baccalaureate degrees, and 18 associate degree and certificate programs. The WNMU's mascot is referred to as the Mustangs. Recognition for the university includes the 2003 Zia Award, the 2005 Best Practice Award (for the School of Education), the 2006 Chamber of Commerce Large Business of the Year Award, the 2008 Piñon Award, and the 2008 Compañero Award.

=== Flooding ===
The town had originally been designed with the streets running north to south. It was also built without adequate planning for stormwater runoff. Businesses sprang up, and people learned to deal with the inconveniences of the summer rain. Silver City was built with high sidewalks in the downtown area to accommodate high flood waters. However, uncontrolled grazing and deforestation over time in the surrounding area contributed to higher levels of runoff. During the night of July 21, 1895, a heavy wall of water rushed through the downtown business district, leaving a trail of destruction. A ditch 55 feet (17 m) lower than the original street level was created in what was once known as Main Street. Businesses on Main Street began using their back doors on Bullard Street as main entrances and eventually, were permanently used as the new front entrances. To this day, the incorrect odd/even addressing conventions on the east side of Bullard Street are a reminder that the buildings were addressed on Main Street originally, not Bullard Street. Main Street now ends near the back of the Silver City Police Station, where the Big Ditch Park begins.

=== Mimbres Mogollon remains ===
The Mimbres Mogollon Indians (A.D. 200–A.D. 1140/50) once lived in the area, along with other prehistoric groups, including the Salado. Mimbres archaeological sites are located throughout Silver City and surrounding communities on federal, state, municipal, and private property. Collecting of Mimbres pottery by landowners and others is documented as far back as the late 1870s. Collecting was something that occurred during a Sunday picnic in the late 19th and early 20th centuries. Some individuals maintained collections that can now be seen in the Smithsonian and other museums, who sent individuals out to acquire collections in the nearby Mimbres Valley during the early 1900s. Others dug into the ancient sites and used the pottery they found for target practice—something that occurred into the 1930s according to oral histories. Collecting and the looting of Mimbres Mogollon sites did not stop with archaeological research conducted on private lands during the 1920s, 1930s, and 1970s, nor with the passage of the New Mexico "Burial Law" in 1989. Sadly, unlawful looting continues to this day, and many prehistoric sites have been badly damaged or obliterated.

== Geography ==
Silver City is located near the center of Grant County, at the southern foot of the Pinos Altos Range of the Mogollon Mountains. The town is 3 miles (5 km) east of the Continental Divide, in the valley of San Vicente Arroyo, a south-flowing tributary of the Mimbres River.

U.S. Route 180 passes through the northern part of the town, leading east 10 miles (16 km) to Bayard and northwest 29 miles (47 km) to Cliff. New Mexico State Road 90 (Hudson Street) leads southwest 45 miles (72 km) to Lordsburg and Interstate 10, and State Road 15 leads north 44 miles (71 km) to Gila Cliff Dwellings National Monument.

According to the U.S. Census Bureau, Silver City has a total area of 10.2 square miles (26.3 km^{2}), of which 0.02 square miles (0.04 km^{2}), or 0.17%, is water.

== Geology ==
The local geology of the Silver City area is complex. Sedimentary gravels are found in the form of the alluvial Mangas Valley gravels. Metamorphic schist and gneiss are also found. The downtown area is mostly made of granite outcrops.

== Climate ==
The climate of Silver City is classified as Csa (Mediterranean with hot summers and cool winters) in the Köppen system. A Mediterranean climate is unusual in New Mexico, occurring only in a small upland area in the southwestern part of the state. Silver City's climate is characterized by moderate rainfall in fall and winter (October to February), a dry spring (March to June), and rains from (July to September) in what is called the North American Monsoon. The monsoon, which is irregular from year to year, impacts mostly southern New Mexico and southeastern Arizona in the United States.

During the period from 1901 to 1964, when readings were taken at the city center (which is cooler and wetter than outlying and lower-elevation districts nearby), the coldest temperature recorded was −13 °F (−25 °C) on January 11, 1962, and the hottest 105 °F (40.6 °C) on July 5, 1901. The coldest month was January 1949, with a monthly mean temperature of 28.7 °F or −1.8 °C, and the hottest, July 1951, which averaged 77.4 °F or 25.2 °C. The wettest calendar year in this time span was 1914, with 24.97 inches or 634.2 millimeters and the driest, 1947 with 6.77 inches or 172.0 millimeters. The most snow in one season was 48.0 inches or 1.2 meters between July 1912 and June 1913, which featured the coldest winter on record with 33.1 °F or 0.6 °C as the mean from December to February.

Climate data for Silver City, New Mexico, 1991–2021. (Elevation 5,919 feet or 1,800 metres)
Month	Jan	Feb	Mar	Apr	May	Jun	Jul	Aug	Sep	Oct	Nov	Dec	Year
Mean daily maximum °F (°C)	49.1 (9.5)	52.9 (11.6)	60.5 (15.8)	68.6 (20.3)	76.4 (24.7)	85.9 (29.9)	84.0 (28.9)	81.6 (27.6)	77.2 (25.1)	68.5 (20.3)	58.1 (14.5)	48.6 (9.2)	67.6 (19.8)
Daily mean °F (°C)	36.6 (2.6)	40.0 (4.4)	47.0 (8.3)	55.0 (12.8)	63.7 (17.6)	73.7 (23.2)	73.0 (22.8)	70.7 (21.5)	66.1 (18.9)	56.6 (13.7)	45.9 (7.7)	36.6 (2.6)	55.4 (13.0)
Mean daily minimum °F (°C)	27.3 (−2.6)	30.0 (−1.1)	34.8 (1.6)	41.8 (5.4)	50.1 (10.1)	60.1 (15.6)	62.0 (16.7)	59.8 (15.4)	55.1 (12.8)	45.8 (7.7)	35.8 (2.1)	28.1 (−2.2)	44.2 (6.8)
Average precipitation inches (mm)	1.38 (35)	1.38 (35)	0.91 (23)	0.47 (12)	0.43 (11)	0.71 (18)	2.87 (73)	2.52 (64)	1.69 (43)	1.22 (31)	1.14 (29)	1.57 (40)	16.29 (414)
Average snowfall inches (cm)	2.68 (6.8)	1.65 (4.2)	0.47 (1.2)	0 (0)	0 (0)	0 (0)	0 (0)	0 (0)	0 (0)	0.04 (0.10)	2.76 (7.0)	2.95 (7.5)	10.55 (26.8)
Average precipitation days	4	4	3	2	2	2	9	9	5	4	3	4	51
Source: Climate Data Note: Climatic data will vary slightly depending upon the period of time chosen to calculate average figures.

== Demographics ==
Historical population
Census	Pop.	Note	%±
1880	1,800		—
1890	2,102		16.8%
1900	2,735		30.1%
1910	3,217		17.6%
1920	2,662		−17.3%
1930	3,519		32.2%
1940	5,044		43.3%
1950	7,022		39.2%
1960	6,972		−0.7%
1970	8,557		22.7%
1980	9,887		15.5%
1990	10,683		8.1%
2000	10,545		−1.3%
2010	10,315		−2.2%
2020	9,704		−5.9%
U.S. Decennial Census

=== 2020 census ===
As of the 2020 census, Silver City had a population of 9,704. The median age was 44.5 years. 19.1% of residents were under the age of 18 and 25.7% of residents were 65 years of age or older. For every 100 females there were 90.7 males, and for every 100 females age 18 and over there were 88.4 males age 18 and over.

96.5% of residents lived in urban areas, while 3.5% lived in rural areas.

There were 4,293 households in Silver City, of which 23.6% had children under the age of 18 living in them. Of all households, 33.3% were married-couple households, 22.8% were households with a male householder and no spouse or partner present, and 35.8% were households with a female householder and no spouse or partner present. About 38.2% of all households were made up of individuals and 19.2% had someone living alone who was 65 years of age or older.

There were 4,954 housing units, of which 13.3% were vacant. The homeowner vacancy rate was 2.9% and the rental vacancy rate was 9.2%.

Racial composition as of the 2020 census
Race	Number	Percent
White	5,962	61.4%
Black or African American	185	1.9%
American Indian and Alaska Native	203	2.1%
Asian	118	1.2%
Native Hawaiian and Other Pacific Islander	12	0.1%
Some other race	1,225	12.6%
Two or more races	1,999	20.6%
Hispanic or Latino (of any race)	4,880	50.3%

=== 2000 census ===
As of the census of 2000, there were 10,545 people, 4,227 households, and 2,730 families residing in the town. The population density was 1,040.1 inhabitants per square mile (401.6/km^{2}). There were 4,757 housing units at an average density of 469.2 per square mile (181.2/km^{2}). The racial makeup of the town was 71.7% White, 0.9% African American, 1.1% Native American, 0.5% Asian, 0.1% Pacific Islander, 22.4% from other races, and 3.4% from two or more races. Hispanic or Latino of any race were 39.8% of the population.

There were 4,227 households, out of which 30.0% had children under the age of 18 living with them, 44.6% were married couples living together, 15.4% had a female householder with no husband present, and 35.4% were non-families. 30.3% of all households were made up of individuals, and 11.9% had someone living alone who was 65 years of age or older. The average household size was 2.40 and the average family size was 3.00.

In the town, the population by age was: 25.0% under the age of 18, 11.4% from 18 to 24, 24.2% from 25 to 44, 23.1% from 45 to 64, and 16.3% who were 65 years of age or older. The median age was 37 years. For every 100 females, there were 91.0 males. For every 100 females age 18 and over, there were 85.7 males.

The median income for a household in the town was $25,881, and the median income for a family was $31,374. Males had a median income of $28,476 versus $18,434 for females. The per capita income for the town was $13,813. About 17.7% of families and 21.9% of the population were below the poverty line, including 29.2% of those under age 18 and 10.0% of those age 65 or over.

== Economy ==
Silver City was founded as a mining town. George Hearst built a smelter after the Silver City, Deming and Pacific narrow-gauge railway reached Silver City in 1883. The Santa Fe Railroad provided standard gauge rail service in 1886, and Commanche Mining and Smelting extended the two-foot narrow-gauge Silver City, Pinos Altos and Mogollon Railroad to Pinos Altos in 1906 (none of which are still in existence).

The nearby mining operations, formerly Phelps Dodge, are still the basis for the local economy. In 2006, the Chino and Tyrone mines produced 125,400 long tons (127,400 t) of copper. Mine employment was 1,250, with wages and salaries totaling $73 million. However, a Phelps-Dodge spokesman remarked in 2007 that "based on current economic projections, our properties in New Mexico will not be operating in 25 years". Phelps Dodge was acquired by international mining firm Freeport-McMoRan in March 2007, and operations at the Chino and Tyrone operations are continuing under the Freeport name.

Tourism, retirement and trade are the other major components of Silver City's economy. In 2006, an average three-bedroom, 1,500-square-foot (140 m^{2}) house sold for about $160,000.

== Arts and culture ==
Silver City is home to many musicians and artists and has a thriving downtown arts district. The Silco Theater, built in 1923, was renovated and re-opened on February 26, 2016, as a 156-seat community movie house.

Mimbres Region Arts Council (MRAC) has been named #1 arts council in New Mexico for a decade and is the recipient of the 2013 New Mexico Governor's Award for Excellence in the Arts. MRAC presents the Silver City Blues Festival each May and Pickamania—a Bluegrass, Americana, Folk and acoustic festival—each September, in addition to a number of other arts events throughout the year. MRAC's Youth Mural Program has brought school children together with artists and community members to create over 40 public murals throughout the region.

Grant County Community Concert Association presents numerous performance events each fall, winter, and spring. The first Southwest Festival of the Written Word was held in 2013, at multiple venues in historic downtown Silver City. Over 50 presenters—fiction and nonfiction writers, poets, bloggers, journalists, lyricists, editors, dramatists, and publishers from throughout the Southwest—were represented.

The Red Paint Pow Wow, Chicano Music Festival, Silver City Clay Festival, Red Dot Studio & Gallery Tours, Chocolate Fantasia, Gila River Festival, Red Hot Children's Fiesta, Tamal Fiesta y Mas and the Silver City Fiber Arts Festival are also held in Silver City.

Whiskey Creek Zócalo opened in 2023 featuring a live-music venue, artist workshops, and plant nursery. Run by two generations of native New Mexico residents with a strong appreciation for community and New Mexico culture.

== Education ==
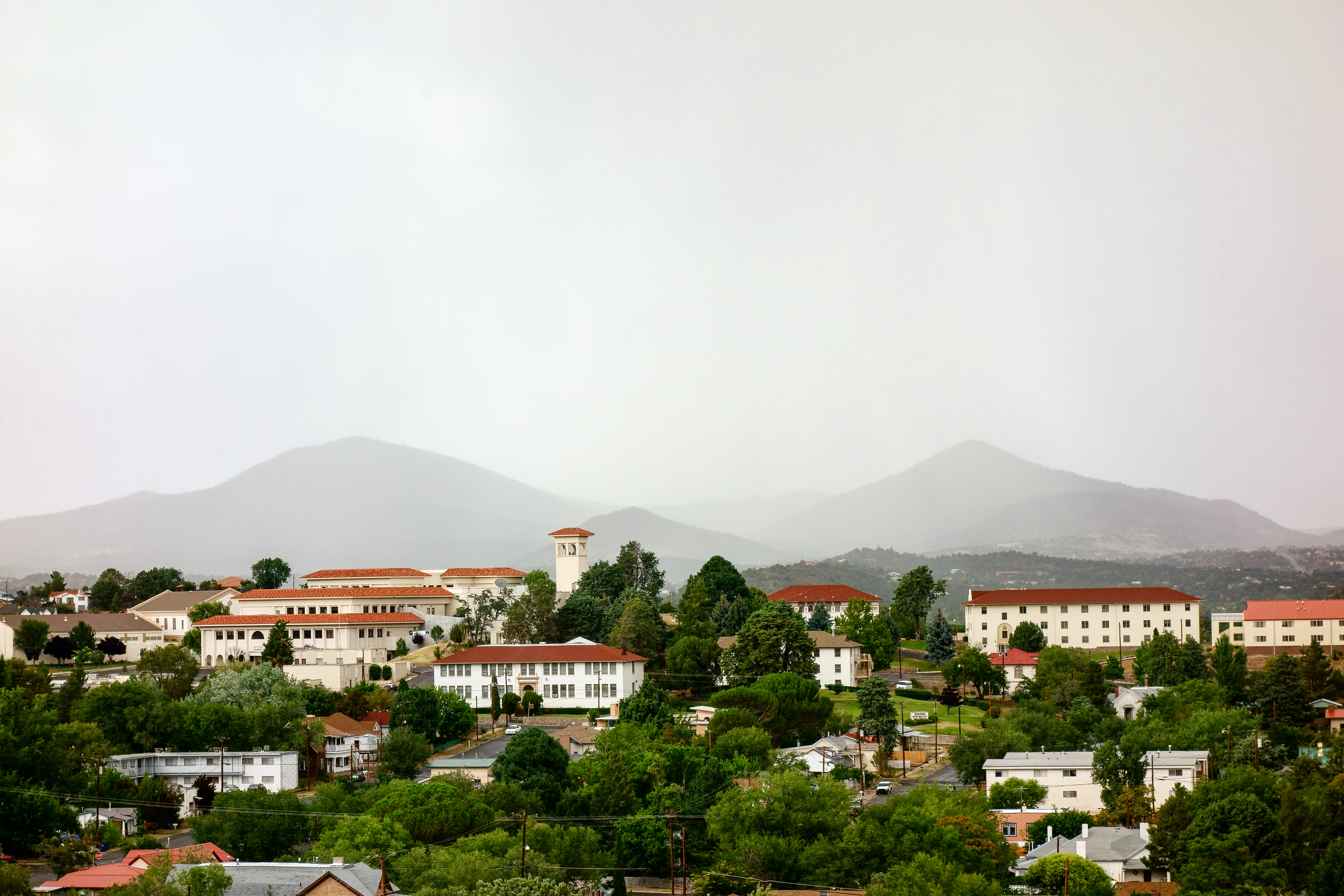
Scenic view of the WNMU campus, 2012

=== Public schools ===
Public schools are in the Silver Consolidated School District, as well as one state-authorized charter high school. The District covers the Town of Silver City as well as Cliff, Pinos Altos, Tyrone, and White Signal. The system has five elementary schools, one middle school, and two high schools.

==== Elementary schools ====
- G.W. Stout Elementary
- Harrison H. Schmitt Elementary
- Jose Barrios Jr. Elementary
- Sixth Street Elementary

==== Middle school ====
- La Plata Middle School
- Aldo Leopold Charter School (middle school and high school)

==== High schools ====
- Opportunity High School
- Silver High School
- Aldo Leopold Charter School (middle school and high school)

=== Private schools ===
Private schools include:

- Calvary Christian Academy
- Guadalupe Montessori School

=== Colleges ===
- Western New Mexico University

== Transportation ==
Airports

- Grant County Airport, a county-owned public use airport also served by one commercial airline, located 10 miles (16 km) southeast of Silver City.
- Whiskey Creek Airport (FAA LID: 94E), a public use airport located four nautical miles (7 km) east of the central business district of Silver City.

Major highways

- U.S. Route 180
- New Mexico State Road 90

== Media ==
=== Newspapers ===
- Silver City Daily Press and Independent

=== Radio ===
- 89.1 FM KURU, Gila / Mimbres Community Radio
- 88.1 FM KOOT, owned by Community Access Television of Silver

=== Television ===
- Community Access Television of Silver (CATS) - local cable channels 17, 18, and 19

== Points of interest ==
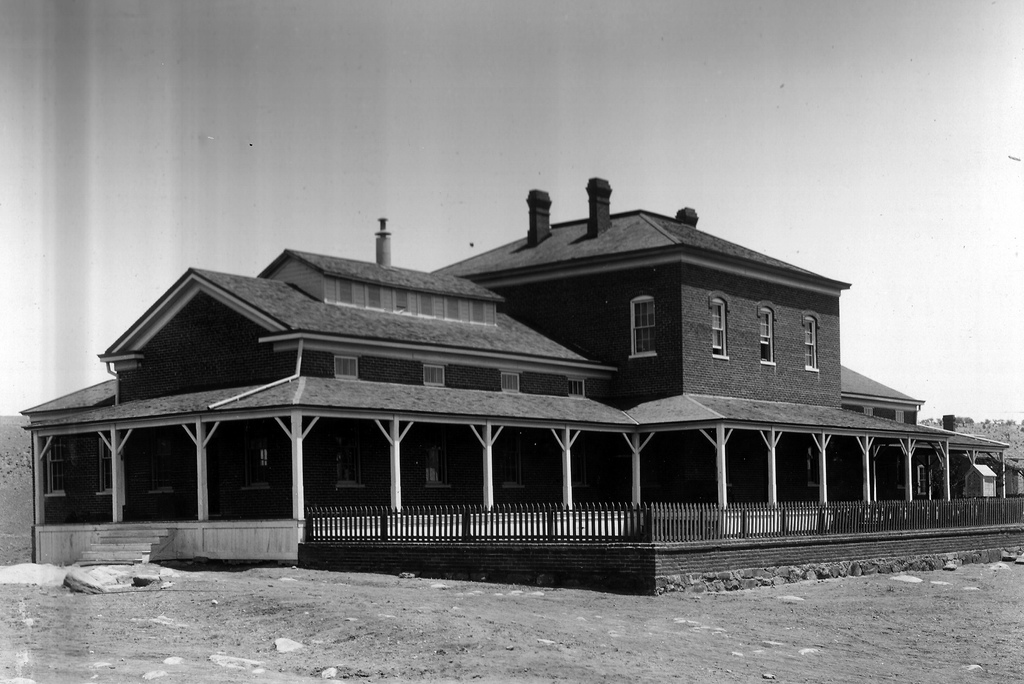
Ft. Bayard post hospital in 1890, a building listed on the NRHP

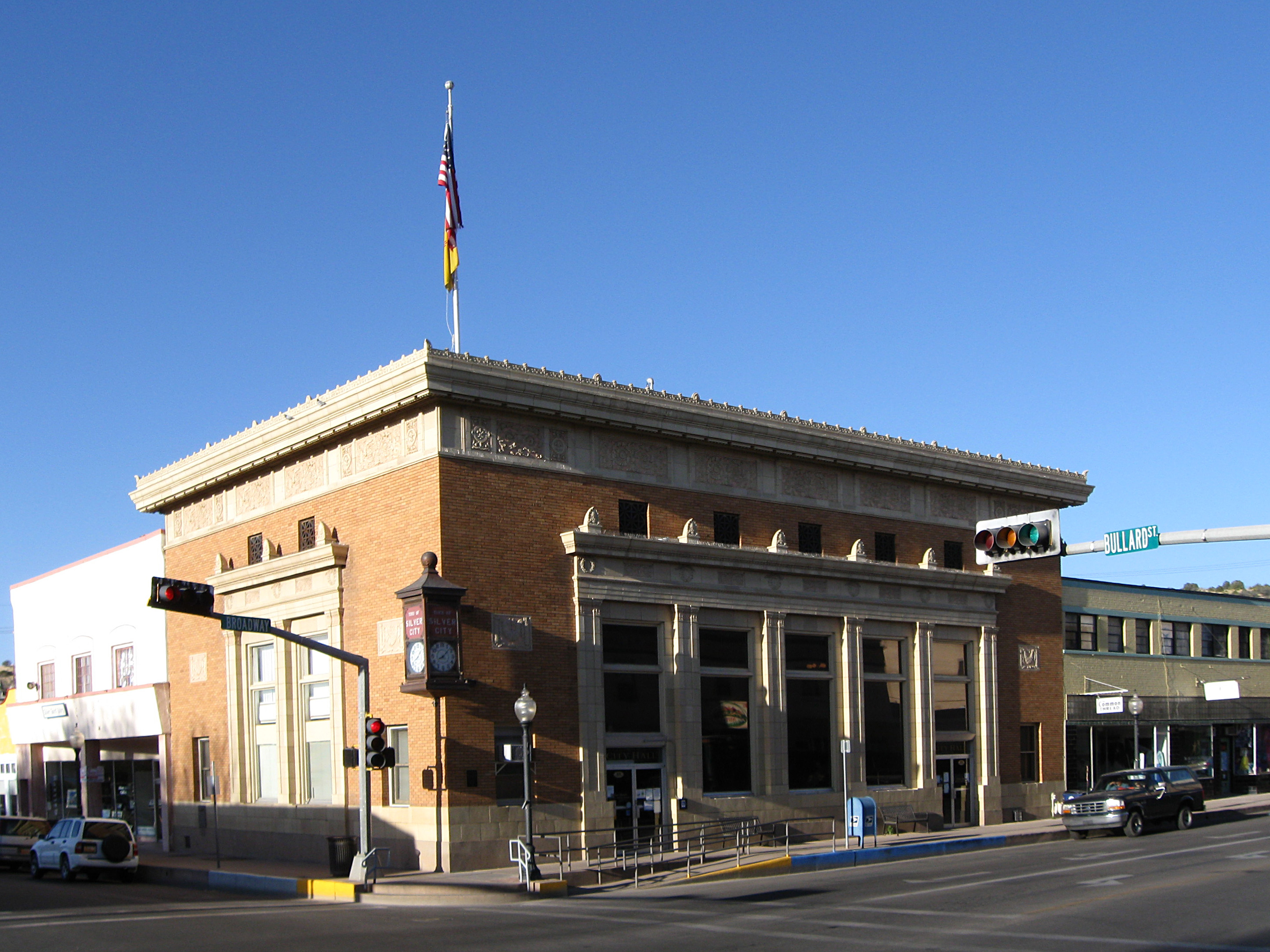
City hall

The Gila Cliff Dwellings National Monument is about 44 miles (71 km) north of Silver City, via the winding NM 15. At the monument, the remains of Indigenous inhabitants within five caves in a cliff can be found. They were built sometime between 1275 and 1300 AD by the Mogollon culture. In addition to ancient ruins, there are plenty of places to camp, hike and fish within the Gila Wilderness.

The Catwalk is a trail enclosed by a metal walkway that suspends 25 feet (7.6 m) above the Whitewater Canyon hugging the canyon walls. It follows water-pipe routes built by miners in 1893. When the pipes needed repair, the miners walked on them. Visitors can explore the walkway and trail, picnic, and enjoy the river. It is located 70 miles (110 km) north of Silver City on U.S. Route 180 near Glenwood.

There are several lakes in the area. Lake Roberts covers 72-acre (290,000 m^{2}) about 27 miles (43 km) north of Silver City on NM 15 near the NM 35 junction. Other lakes in the Silver City area include Bill Evans Lake, Snow Lake, Wall Lake, and Bear Canyon Dam. Anglers have a choice of brown and rainbow trout, catfish, and bass. In addition, several mountainous rivers can be found nearby. Some of note are the Gila River, Negrito Creek, San Francisco River, and Willow Creek.

The Kneeling Nun is a natural rock formation located about 20 miles (32 km) to the east of Silver City along NM 152. Several legends have developed explaining its origin.

Nearby is Fort Bayard Historic District, about eight miles east of Silver City, off of US Highway 180. The District was the location of Fort Bayard, which was established in 1866 to station soldiers of the US Army in proximity to mining camps in the region. In later years the fort was converted to an Army hospital, specializing in the treatment of tuberculosis. In the early 1920s it became a US Veterans Hospital under the Veterans Administration. The property was sold to the State of New Mexico in 1965, which used the facility as a State Hospital. With the construction of a newer hospital in 2010, the property was vacated. Fort Bayard then became home to a museum, maintained by the Fort Bayard Historic Preservation Society. The museum personnel offer tours of both the building and the grounds on a regular schedule.

== Notable people ==
- Alfred Shea Addis (1832–1886), photographer of Billy the Kid's mother's home; resident
- Ben D. Altamirano (1930–2007), politician and businessman
- Poker Alice (Alice Ivers Duffield Tubbs Huckert), frontier gambler; resident
- Roy Bean, American saloon-keeper and justice of the peace
- Paul Benedict, actor, "Harry Bentley" on The Jeffersons
- Billy the Kid, outlaw, a.k.a. Henry McCarty, Henry Antrim, William H. Bonney
- Jeff Bingaman, U.S. Senator; raised in Silver City
- Daniel B. Borenstein, MD, President, American Psychiatric Association; raised in Silver City
- Karen Carr, artist
- Kit Carson, western scout and frontiersman, in 1829 went into Apache country along the Gila River
- Cochise, Apache war leader who raided surrounding area
- Anita Scott Coleman, writer
- Philip Connors, writer
- George Crook, U.S. Army major general
- Doyne Farmer, physicist
- Geronimo, Native American military leader and medicine man; born at the headwaters of the Gila River (north of Silver City)
- George Hearst, US Senator from California and mining entrepreneur. Father of William Randolph Hearst.
- Leslie Graves, actress, "Brenda Clegg" on Capitol
- Charles S. Kilburn, U.S. Army brigadier general
- Ben Lilly (1856–1936), hunter and mountain man
- Ralph McPherran Kiner, American MLB player and broadcaster.
- Mangas Coloradas or "Dasoda-hae" (known as "Red Sleeves"), Apache war leader
- Howie Morales (born 1973), American politician and educator, Lieutenant Governor of New Mexico
- Naiche, Apache war chief, second son of Cochise; roamed area with Geronimo
- Nana, Apache war leader who roamed the Silver City area
- William Harrell Nellis, United States fighter pilot who flew 70 World War II combat missions
- Nichelle Nichols (1932–2022), actress, singer and dancer; died in Silver City
- Norman Packard, physicist
- Phillip Parotti, fiction writer and educator
- Harrison Schmitt, American geologist, NASA astronaut, former U.S. senator
- Angela Sommer-Bodenburg, author
- James Tenney (1934–2006), composer; born in Silver City
- Victorio, Apache war leader who roamed and attacked area
- Cathay Williams, first African-American female to enlist in the US Army (posed as a man)
- George L. Young, track athlete

== In popular culture ==
Silver City was the finish line in the 2001 movie Rat Race, in which several people race from Las Vegas to a locker containing $2 million in Silver City's train station. In reality, there is no longer a train station in Silver City and the movie was not filmed in Silver City.

Silver City is mentioned in the 2007 film There Will Be Blood, whose screenplay was written by Paul Thomas Anderson and was based on the 1927 novel Oil! by Upton Sinclair. Upton Sinclair based his novel on the experiences of Edward L. Doheny, a prospector and oil tycoon living in the Silver City area (near Kingston). In the movie, Henry, the man claiming to be Daniel's half-brother, says that he had been in Silver City for two years drilling on his own.

In the 1956 film Backlash, Jim Slater, played by Richard Widmark, goes to Silver City with the body of the deputy sheriff he killed. Slater is advised to leave quickly for Tucson by the sheriff, who advises him, "We don't like gunfights here in Silver City."

In the 2010 road trip movie Friendship!, the two friends Veit and Tom are stopped and arrested by Silver City police because of driving naked. Since their car was damaged, they need to rest and raise some money in Silver City for getting their car repaired before being able to continue their trip.

The film A Boy Called Sailboat was filmed in and near Silver City in 2016.

In 1954 the film Salt of the Earth, one of the first pictures to advance the feminist social and political point of view, centers on a long and difficult strike, based on the 1951 strike against the Empire Zinc Company in Grant County. The movie featured many local non-actors, the movie was not filmed in Silver City but in a small town 17 miles east.

Silver City is mentioned in several episodes in the highly rated ABC series The Rifleman (1958–1963) starring Chuck Connors in the title role. Silver City is located some distance from the fictional North Fork town where the program is situated. Silver City is mentioned in Marty Robbins' 1959 album Gunfighter Ballads and Trail Songs as where Billy the Kid "went to the bad." Stephen King's book The Stand mentions Silver City as well as the Town of Deming, Bayard and Hurley.
