= Pinos Altos, New Mexico =

- Census-designated place
- Location within New Mexico Location within the United States
- Coordinates: 32°52′15″N 108°13′07″W
- Country: United States
- State: New Mexico
- County: Grant

Area
  - Total: 0.76 sq mi (1.96 km^{2})
  - Land: 0.76 sq mi (1.96 km^{2})
  - Water: 0 sq mi (0.00 km^{2})
- Elevation: 6,985 ft (2,129 m)

Population (2020)
  - Total: 225
  - Density: 297.5/sq mi (114.85/km^{2})
- Time zone: UTC-7 (Mountain (MST))
  - Summer (DST): UTC-6 (MDT)
- ZIP code: 88053
- Area code: 575
- GNIS feature ID: 2584179
- Website: www.pinosaltos.org

Pinos Altos is a census-designated place in Grant County, New Mexico, United States. The community was a mining town, formed in 1860 following the discovery of gold in the nearby Pinos Altos Mountains. The town site is located about five to ten miles north of the present day Silver City. Although once abandoned, the town is now a place for summer homes and caters to tourists. As of the 2020 census, Pinos Altos had a population of 225.

== History ==
Originally named Birchville, after prospector and former outlaw, Robert H. Birch, one of three people who found the first gold, it later took the Spanish name Pinos Altos, meaning tall pines, because there were tall trees growing in the area. These were cut down as the town grew to a population of about 9,000 during the 1880s and 1890s before slowly being abandoned during the early 1900s. Today, many of the original buildings remain.

From the discovery of gold in 1860 until late 1861, miners were harassed by Apache Indians opposed to American and Mexican settlers occupying their lands. On September 27, 1861, it was the site of the Battle of Pinos Altos between the Arizona Guards of Pinos Altos, a Confederate Arizona Territorial militia company, and Apache warriors led by Mangas Coloradas and Cochise. This battle did not end the conflict between settlers and Native Americans, which continued for several years, with neither side particularly willing to see the dispute resolved peacefully. Even when a treaty was eventually negotiated between the settlers and Indians, a settler hosting a dinner to celebrate the signing opened fire on 60 unarmed Indians, killing and injuring many of those assembled. Indian hostility continued until the military built permanent forts in the area, most significant of which was Fort Bayard, established a few miles to the southeast in 1866.

In 1861 Samuel G. and Roy Bean (depicted in the movie The Life and Times of Judge Roy Bean) operated a store and saloon on Main Street in Pinos Altos. It advertised liquor and "a fine billiard table". Roy's cannon, which had been used to repel an Apache assault on the town, was displayed in front of the store.

Senator George Hearst invested in several Pinos Altos mines, including the Mina Grande and the Pacific Mine. He built a stamp mill in Pinos Altos in 1889, and incorporated the Silver City, Pinos Altos and Mogollon Railroad to connect these properties to his Silver City smelter. Comanche Mining and Smelting Company completed the 2-foot narrow gauge railroad in 1906; but the railroad closed when the price of copper plunged the following year.

The old opera house has been combined into a restaurant with the Buckhorn Saloon.

== Demographics ==
Historical population
Census	Pop.	Note	%±
2020	225		—
U.S. Decennial Census
