= Whistled language =

Emulation of speech by whistling

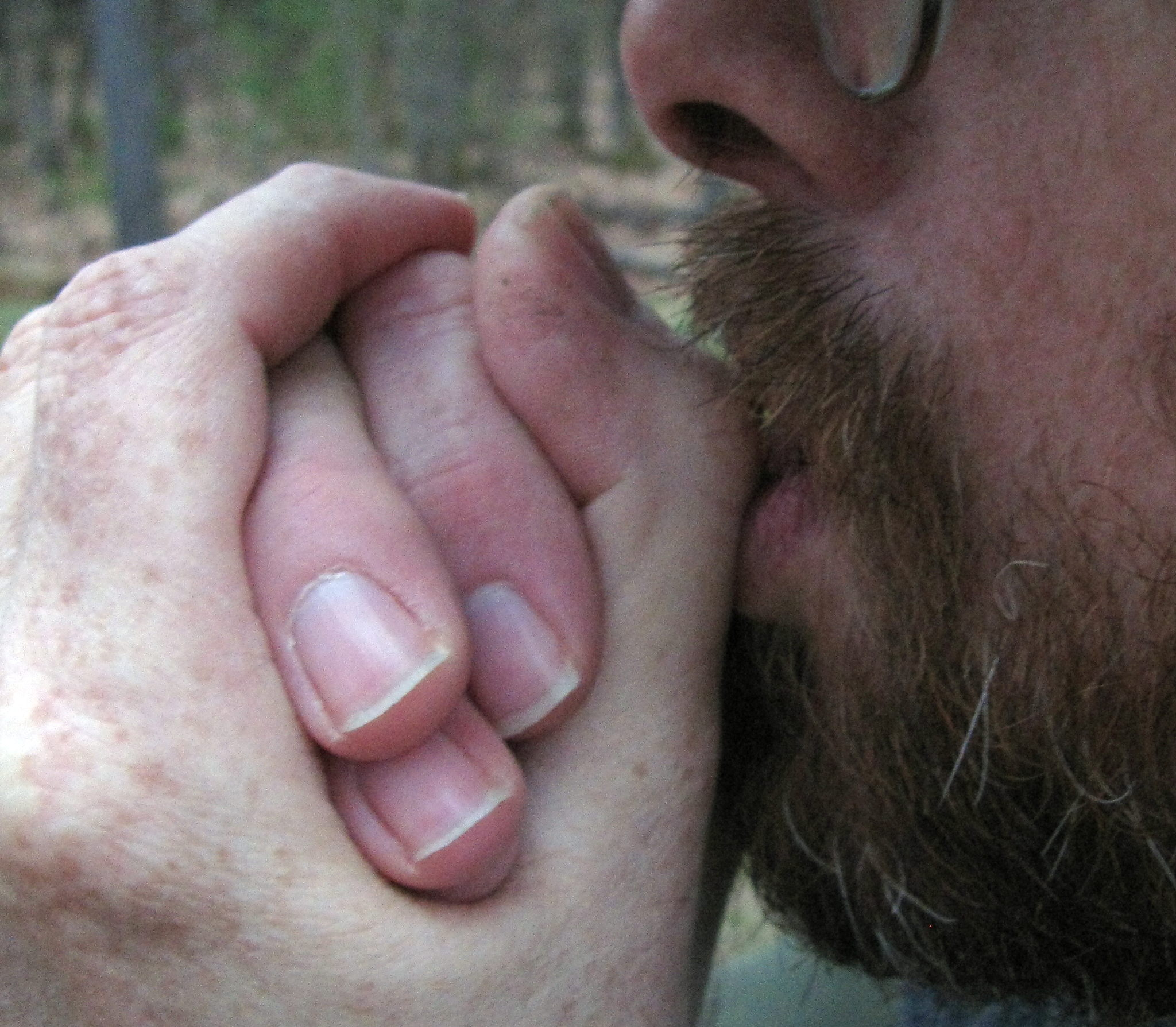
Those who are able to speak using whistled language often use their hands or fingers to modify the sound produced.

Sfyria
A conversation in the Sfyria whistled language

Whistled speech is a form of speech surrogacy in which whistling is used to mimic speech. Speakers of more than 80 languages have been found to practice various degrees of whistled speech, most of them in rugged topography or dense forests, where movement to carry messages is challenging, and whistling expands the distance of communication. The practice is generally threatened by increased modernization and faster roads, but successful conservation efforts are recorded.

== Definition ==
A whistled language is a system of whistled communication which allows fluent whistlers to transmit and comprehend a potentially unlimited number of messages over long distances. Whistled languages are different in this respect from free associative whistling, which may be done to simulate music, to attract attention, or, in the case of herders or animal trainers, to transmit simple messages or instructions to animal companions. Generally, whistled languages emulate the tones or vowel formants of a natural spoken language, as well as aspects of its intonation and prosody, so that trained listeners who speak that language can understand the encoded message.

Whistled language is rare compared to spoken language, but it is found in cultures around the world. It is especially common in tone languages where the whistled tones transmit the tones of the syllables (tone melodies of the words). This might be because in tone languages the tone melody carries more of the functional load of communication while non-tonal phonology carries proportionally less. The genesis of a whistled language has never been recorded in either case and has not yet received much productive study.

== History ==
Because whistled language is so much rarer than standard vocal language or non-verbal physical language such as sign language, historical research on whistled speech is sparse.

In early China, the technique of transcendental whistling, or xiao, was a kind of nonverbal language with affinities to the spiritual aspects of Daoist meditation. The development of xiao as a practice and art form can be traced through the works of the Western Zhou dynasty, and it was initially used to convey a sense of grief, or to invoke the spirits of dearly departed loved ones. By the time of the Six Dynasties in Han China, xiao had become a widely used complement to spoken language, irrespective of social class. Due to the shrill tones employed while whistling, xiao was often used to punctuate intense feelings or reactions, such as joy, displeasure, and surprise.

In the Melpomene, the fourth book of his Histories, Herodotus makes a passing reference to an Ethiopian tribe who "spoke like bats". While travelling through the territory of an ancient tribe on the southern Black Sea coast in 400 B.C.E, Xenophon wrote in the Anabasis that the Mossynoeci inhabitants could hear one another at great distances across the valleys. The same area encompasses the Turkish village of Kuşköy where whistled speech (kuş dili) is practiced today.

In 1982 in the Greek village of Antia on Euboea island, the entire population knew the local whistled speech called sfyria, but only a few whistlers remain now.

== Causes of whistled language development ==
=== Ecology ===
Whistled languages have naturally developed in response to the necessity for humans to communicate in conditions of relative isolation, with possible causes being distance, noise levels, and night, as well as specific activities, such as social information, shepherding, hunting, fishing, courtship, or shamanism. Because of this usage, they are mostly related to places with mountains or dense forests. Southern China, Papua New Guinea, the Amazon forest, Subsaharan Africa, Mexico, and Europe encompass most of these locations.

They have been more recently found in dense forests like the Amazon where they may replace spoken dialogue in the villages while hunting or fishing to overcome the pressure of the acoustic environment. The main advantage of whistling speech is that it allows the speaker to cover much larger distances (typically 1–2 kilometres (0.62–1.24 mi) but up to 5 km (3.1 mi) in mountains and less in reverberating forests) than ordinary speech, without the strain (and lesser range) of shouting. More specifically, whistle speech can reach a loudness of 130 dB, and the transmission range can reach up to 10 km (as verified in La Gomera, Canary Island). The long range of whistling is enhanced by the mountainous terrain found in areas where whistled languages are used. Many areas with such languages work hard to preserve their ancient traditions, in the face of rapidly advancing telecommunications systems in many areas.

=== Culture ===
In some cases (e.g. Chinantec) the whistled speech is an important and integral part of the language and culture; in others (e.g. Nahuatl) its role is much lesser. Whistled speech may be very central and highly valued in a culture. Shouting is very rare in Sochiapam Chinantec. Men in that culture are subject to being fined if they do not handle whistle-speech well enough to perform certain town jobs. They may whistle for fun in situations where spoken speech could easily be heard.

In Sochiapam, Oaxaca, and other places in Mexico, and reportedly in West and Southern Africa as well (specifically among the VhaVenda), whistled speech is men's language: although women may understand it, they do not use it.

Though whistled languages are not secret codes or secret languages (with the exception of a whistled language used by ñañigos insurgencies in Cuba during Spanish occupation), they may be used for secretive communication among outsiders or others who do not know or understand the whistled language though they may understand its spoken origin. Stories are told of farmers in Aas during World War II, or in La Gomera, who were able to hide evidence of such nefarious activities as milk-watering because they were warned in whistle-speech that the police were approaching.

=== Documentation ===
Various documentation, conservation, and revitalization effort are ongoing. In France, the whistling of Aas is being systematically audio-recorded using open source Lingua Libre. Those recordings have been used to create an interactive maps of Occitan villages names.

== Characteristics of whistled languages ==
=== Tonal and non-tonal whistle languages ===
Whistled languages differ according to whether the spoken language is tonal or not, with the whistling being either tone or articulation based (or both). Most whistle languages, of which there are several hundred, are based on tonal languages.

A way in which true whistled languages differ from other types of whistled communication is that they encode auditory features of spoken languages by 'transposing' (i.e.carrying over into a whistled form) key components of speech sounds. There are two types of whistled languages: those based on non-tone languages, which transpose F^{2} formants patterns, those based on tone languages which transpose tonal-melodies. However, both types of whistle tones have a phonological structure that is related to the spoken language that they are transposing.

Tonal languages are often stripped of articulation, leaving only suprasegmental features such as duration and tone, and when whistled retain the spoken melodic line. Thus whistled tonal languages convey phonemic information solely through tone, length, and, to a lesser extent, stress, and most segmental phonemic distinctions of the spoken language are lost.

In non-tonal languages, more of the articulatory features of speech are retained, and the normally timbral variations imparted by the movements of the tongue and soft palate are transformed into pitch variations. Certain consonants can be pronounced while whistling, so as to modify the whistled sound, much as consonants in spoken language modify the vowel sounds adjacent to them.

Different whistling styles may be used in a single language. Sochiapam Chinantec has three different words for whistle-speech: sie^{3} for whistling with the tongue against the alveolar ridge, jui̵^{32} for bilabial whistling, and juo^{2} for finger-in-the-mouth whistling. These are used for communication over varying distances. There is also a kind of loud falsetto (hóh^{32}) which functions in some ways like whistled speech.

==== Tonal whistle languages and types of tones ====
Only the tone of the speech is saved in the whistle, while aspects as articulation and phonation are eliminated. These are replaced by other features such as stress and rhythmical variations. However, some languages, like that of the Zezuru who speak a Shona-derived dialect, include articulation so that consonants interrupt the flow of the whistle. A similar language is the Tsonga whistle language used in the highlands in the Southern parts of Mozambique. This should not be confused with the whistled sibilants of Shona.

There are two different types of whistle tones - hole tones and edge tones. A hole (or 'orifice') tone is produced by a fast-moving cylinder (or 'vena contracta') of air that interacts with the slow-moving anulus of air surrounding it. Instability in the boundary layer leads to perturbations that increase in size until a feedback path is established whereby specific frequencies of the resonance chamber are emphasized. An edge tone, on the other hand, is generated by a thin jet of air that strikes an obstacle. Vortices are shed near the point of disturbance in the flow, alternating on each side of the obstacle or 'wedge'.

One of the best-studied whistled languages is a whistled language based on Spanish called Silbo, whistled on the island of La Gomera in the Canary Islands (Rialland 2005). The number of distinctive sounds or phonemes in this language is a matter of disagreement, varying according to the researcher from two to five vowels and four to nine consonants. This variation may reflect differences in speakers' abilities as well as in the methods used to elicit contrasts. The work of Meyer clarifies this debate by providing the first statistical analyses of production for various whistlers as well as psycholinguistic tests of vowel identification.

==== Non-tonal whistle languages ====
In a non-tonal language, segments may be differentiated as follows:

Vowels are replaced by a set of relative pitch ranges generally tracking the f_{2} formant of spoken language.

Stress is expressed by higher pitch or increased length

Consonants are produced by pitch transitions of different lengths and height, plus the presence or absence of occlusion. ("Labial stops are replaced by diaphragm or glottal occlusions.")

=== Sound production techniques ===
Whistling techniques do not require the vibration of the vocal cords: they produce a shock effect of the compressed air stream inside the cavity of the mouth and/or of the hands. When the jaws are fixed by a finger, the size of the hole is stable. The air stream expelled makes vibrations at the edge of the mouth. The faster the air stream is expelled, the higher is the noise inside the cavities. If the hole (mouth) and the cavity (intra-oral volume) are well matched, the resonance is tuned, and the whistle is projected more loudly. The frequency of this bioacoustical phenomenon is modulated by the morphing of the resonating cavity that can be, to a certain extent, related to the articulation of the equivalent spoken form. "Apart from the five vowel-phonemes [of Silbo Gomero]—and even these do not invariably have a fixed or steady pitch—all whistled speech-sound realizations are glides which are interpreted in terms of range, contour, and steepness."

==== Bilabial and labiodental techniques ====
There are a few different techniques of how to produce whistle speech, the choice of which is dependent on practical concerns. Bilabial and labiodental techniques are common for short and medium distance discussions (in a market, in the noise of a room, or for hunting); whereas the tongue retroflexed, one or two fingers introduced in the mouth, a blow concentrated at the junction between two fingers or the lower lip pulled while breathing in air are techniques used to reach high levels of power for long distance speaking. Each place has its favorite trend that depends on the most common use of the village and on the personal preferences of each whistler. Whistling with a leaf or a flute is often related to courtship or poetic expression (reported in the Kickapoo language in Mexico and in the Hmong and Akha cultures in Asia).

==== Physics ====
"All whistled languages share one basic characteristic: they function by varying the frequency of a simple wave-form as a function of time, generally with minimal dynamic variations, which is readily understandable since in most cases their only purpose is long-distance communication." A whistled tone is essentially a simple oscillation (or sine wave), and thus timbral variations are impossible. Normal articulation during an ordinary lip-whistle is relatively easy though the lips move little causing a constant of labialization and making labial and labiodental consonants (p, b, m, f, etc.) problematical.

=== Comparison with spoken languages ===
==== Limited expressivity ====
The expressivity of whistled speech is likely to be somewhat limited compared to spoken speech (although not inherently so), but such a conclusion should not be taken as absolute, as it depends heavily on various factors including the phonology of the language. For example, in some tonal languages with few tones, whistled messages typically consist of stereotyped or otherwise standardized expressions, are elaborately descriptive, and often have to be repeated. However, in heavily tonal languages such as Mazatec and Yoruba, a large amount of information is conveyed through pitch even when spoken, and therefore extensive conversations may be whistled. In any case, even for non-tonal languages, measurements indicate that high intelligibility can be achieved with whistled speech (90%) of intelligibility of non-standardized sentences for Greek and the equivalent for Turkish.

==== Lack of comprehension ====
The lack of understanding can be seen with a confusion matrix. It was tested using two speakers of Silbo (Jampolsky 1999). The study revealed that generally, the vowels were relatively easy to understand, and the consonants a bit more difficult.

Confusion matrix of the vowels in the perception test. 'Produced' vowels are displayed horizontally and 'perceived' vowels vertically (Numbers in bold correspond to correct identifications).

Perceived Produced	i	e	a	o	u
i	**15**		1		
e	1		1		
a			**79**	5	
o			4	**15**	3
u				2	**2**

Confusion matrix of the consonants in the perception test. 'Produced' consonants are displayed horizontally and 'perceived' consonants vertically. (Numbers in bold correspond to correct identifications).

Perceived Produced	p	β	f	m	t	ð	n	s	t͡ʃ	l	r	rr	j	ɲ	k	ɣ
p	**7**															
β		**3**	1	1								1				4
f		1			1											
m				**3**												
t	1				**11**						1					
ð						**1**										
n							**4**			1		2		1		
s								**2**	1	1						
t͡ʃ																
l																
r																
rr																
j								1					**3**			1
ɲ					1											
k	1														**3**	
ɣ																**2**

== List of whistled languages ==
Global distribution of whistled languages

More than 80 whistled languages have been found to date. The following list is of languages that exist or existed in a whistled form, or of ethnic groups that speak such languages.

- Africa
  - Cameroon: Gbaya, Doohwaayo, Mofu
  - Ethiopia: Bench, Oyda
  - Ghana: Nchumburu
  - Mozambique: Shona-derived dialect and similar Tsonga language
  - Nigeria: Yoruba
  - Morocco: Central Atlas Tamazight, Tashelhit
  - South Africa: Southern Bantu
  - Spain (La Gomera and El Hierro, Canary Islands): El Silbo ("Silbo Gomero")
  - West Africa: Bafia, Bape, Birifor, Bobo, Burunsi, Daguri, Diola, Ewe, Fongbe, Marka, Ngwe, Twi, Tshi, Ule (among others)
- Americas
  - Bolivia: Sirionó
  - Brazil: Pirahã
  - Colombia: Desano
  - Mexico: Amuzgo, Chinantec, Ch'ol, Kickapoo, Mazatec, Nahuatl, Otomi, Sayula Popoluca, Tepehua, Totonac, Zapotec, whistled Spanish in Tlaxcala
  - United States: Yupik in Alaska Taos
- Asia
  - China: Akha in Yunnan, Hmong Bai
  - Burma: Chin
  - India: Kongthong village of Meghalaya.
  - Laos: Akha, and Hmong
  - Myanmar: Akha, and Hmong
  - Nepal: Chepang
  - St. Lawrence Island: for Siberian Yupik inhabitants, see Yupik, Alaska in America mentioned above.
  - Thailand: Akha, and Hmong
  - Turkey: Turkish bird language (village of Kuşköy^{(tr)})
  - Vietnam: Hmong

Aas
« Aas », the French village where Occitan is whistled, in Occitan whistle.

- Europe
  - Greece (village of Antia on the island of Euboea): Sfyria
  - France (village of Aas, Pyrenees): Whistled language of Aas (based on Béarnese dialect)
- Oceania
  - New Guinea: Yopno, Gadsup, Binumarien, Abau, Folopa, Telefol, Bauzi, (possibly Tairora and Narak, in the latter reportedly linked with the spirits talking)

== See also ==
- Musical language
- Language of the birds
- Solresol
- Kickapoo whistled speech
- Sweep (puppet)
- Clangers, stop motion animation characters using a whistled language.
- Whistled fricative

== Bibliography ==
- Foris, David Paul. 2000. A grammar of Sochiapam Chinantec. Studies in Chinantec languages 6. Dallas: SIL International and UT Arlington.
- Rialland, Annie (2005). "Phonological and Phonetic Aspects of Whistled Languages". Phonology. 22 (2): 237–271. doi:10.1017/S0952675705000552. JSTOR 4615531. S2CID 18615779.
- Meyer, Julien (2008). "Typology and acoustic strategies of whistled languages: Phonetic comparison and perceptual cues of whistled vowels". Journal of the International Phonetic Association. 38 (1): 69–94. doi:10.1017/S0025100308003277. JSTOR 44526964. S2CID 55852067.
