= Kickapoo Traditional Tribe of Texas =

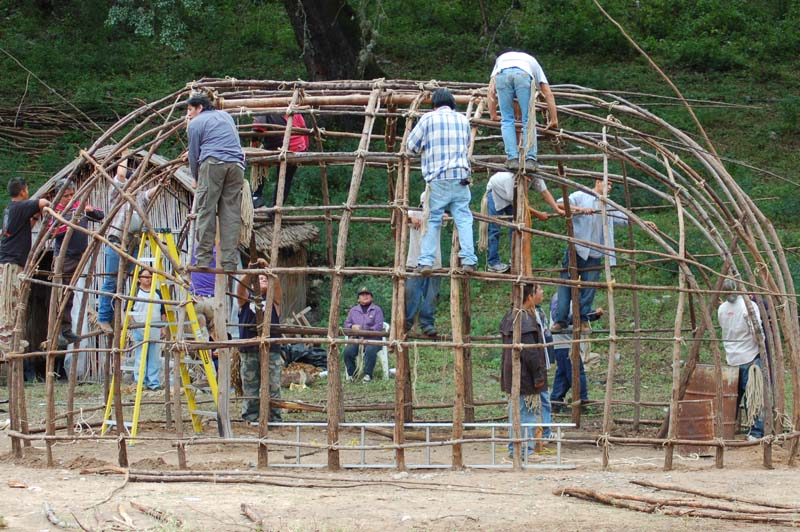
- Southern Kickapoo people building a winter house in Nacimiento, Coahuila, Mexico, 2008

Total population
- 960

Regions with significant populations
- United States (Texas)

Languages
- English, Kickapoo

Religion
- traditional tribal religion

Related ethnic groups
- other Kickapoo people and Meskwaki, Sauk, and Shawnee people

Kickapoo Indian Reservation
- Indian reservation
- Location in Texas
- Tribe: Kickapoo Traditional Tribe of Texas
- Country: United States
- State: Texas
- County: Maverick
- Headquarters: Rosita South

Government
  - Body: Tribal Council
  - Chairman: Juan Garza Jr.
  - Secretary: Freddy Hernandez Sr.
  - Treasurer: David Treviño

Population (2017)
  - Total: 416
- Website: kickapootexas.org

The Kickapoo Traditional Tribe of Texas, based in Eagle Pass, is a federally recognized tribe of Kickapoo people. It uses revenue from its gaming and business operations to provide housing, education, and social services to its members. The tribe has been held as a model for other Native American tribes seeking to lift their members out of poverty, because they were living under the international bridge over the Rio Grande as recently as the 1980s.

They are one of three federally recognized tribes in Texas.

== Reservation ==
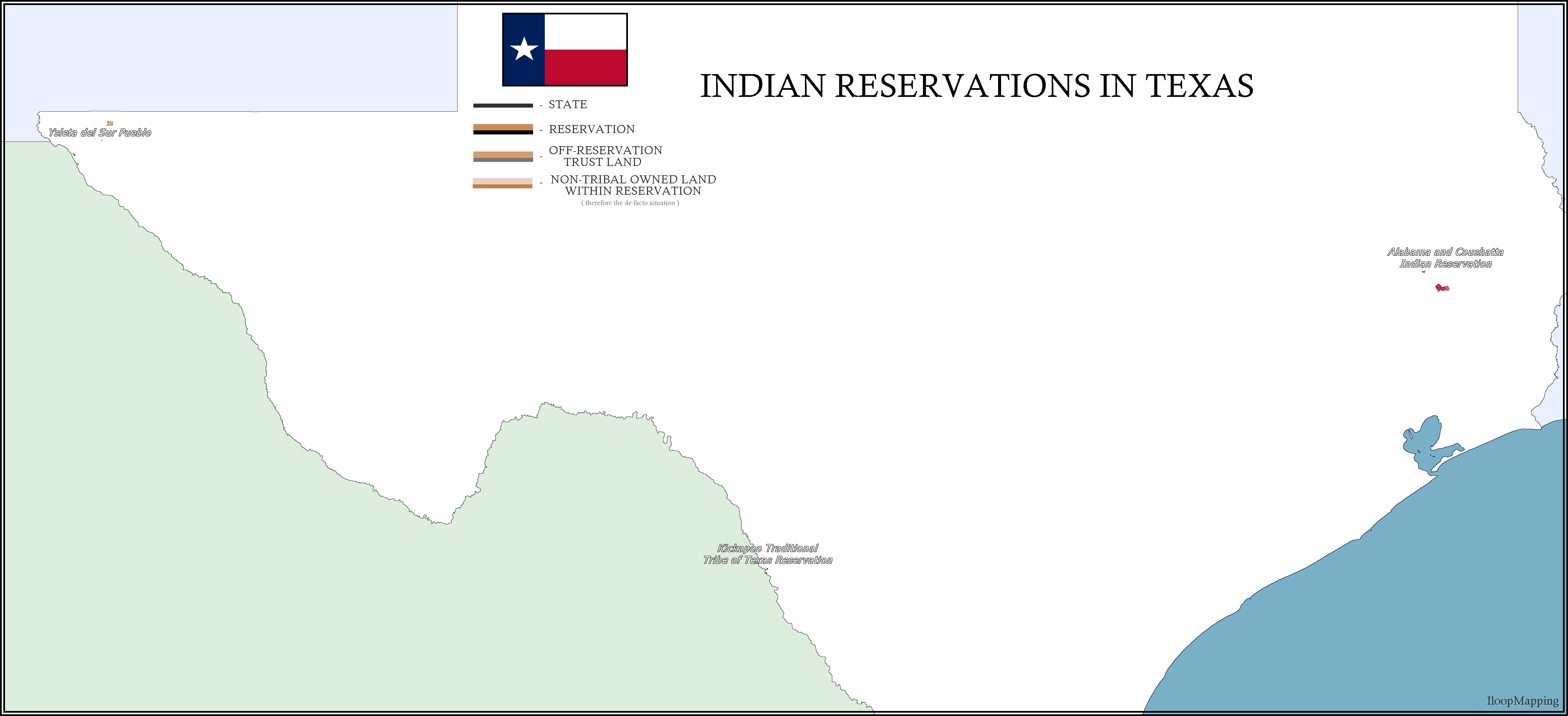
Map of the Kickapoo (TX) Reservation and neighboring reservations (In gray).

The Kickapoo Indian Reservation of Texas is located at 28°36′37″N 100°26′19″W on the Rio Grande on the U.S.-Mexico border in western Maverick County, just south of the city of Eagle Pass, as part of the community of Rosita South. It has a land area of 120 acres (48 ha). About 960 tribal members are living on the Eagle Pass reservation and tribal lands in Nacimiento, Mexico, where the tribe often holds ceremonies. Tribal members must be at least one-fourth Kickapoo.

== Government ==
The Texas Kickapoos adopted their constitution in 1989. They are governed by the Traditional Council, made up of five members elected by secret ballot. The current council chairman is Estavio Elizondo Sr., Menikapah.

== Language ==
Many tribal members speak English, Spanish, and the Kickapoo language, which is a Fox language and part of the Algonquian language family. They also use Kickapoo whistled speech.

== Economic development ==
Tribal enterprises include the Kickapoo Lucky Eagle Casino Hotel, which provides Class II gaming, the Lucky Eagle Convenience Store, Kickapoo Empire, which is an 8A business, a pecan farm, ranches located in both the U.S. and Mexico, a gas station in Múzquiz, Coahuila, Mexico, with PEMEX, and other businesses in Maverick County. Tribal members receive educational, housing, wellness, and other social services from the tribe.

== History ==
The Texas Kickapoo's history is intertwined with that of Texas. According to the Handbook of Texas, the tribe settled in Texas in the early 1800s at the invitation of the Spanish government, which was hoping native tribes would provide a buffer against American settlement in the region. By 1839, however, most Kickapoos had left Texas for Mexico or Indian Territory as a treaty proposed by Sam Houston was never ratified. The tribe was granted land in Nacimiento, Coahuila, by the Mexican government in 1852. Tribal members returned to Texas periodically and over the years became seasonal migrant farmers in the U.S. The tribe was officially recognized by the Texas Indian Commission under Senate Bill 168, 65th Legislature, Regular Session, in 1977. In 1982, they were recognized as an official subgroup of the Oklahoma Kickapoo Indian Tribe, enabling them to acquire their own reservation, under control of the Bureau of Indian Affairs instead of the state of Texas. In 1985, the tribe was granted a government-to-government relationship with the U.S. federal government, which granted them the 118 acres in Eagle Pass they occupy today and have maintained the relationship continuously.
