= Kongthong =

Kongthong Kongthong Singing Village
- village
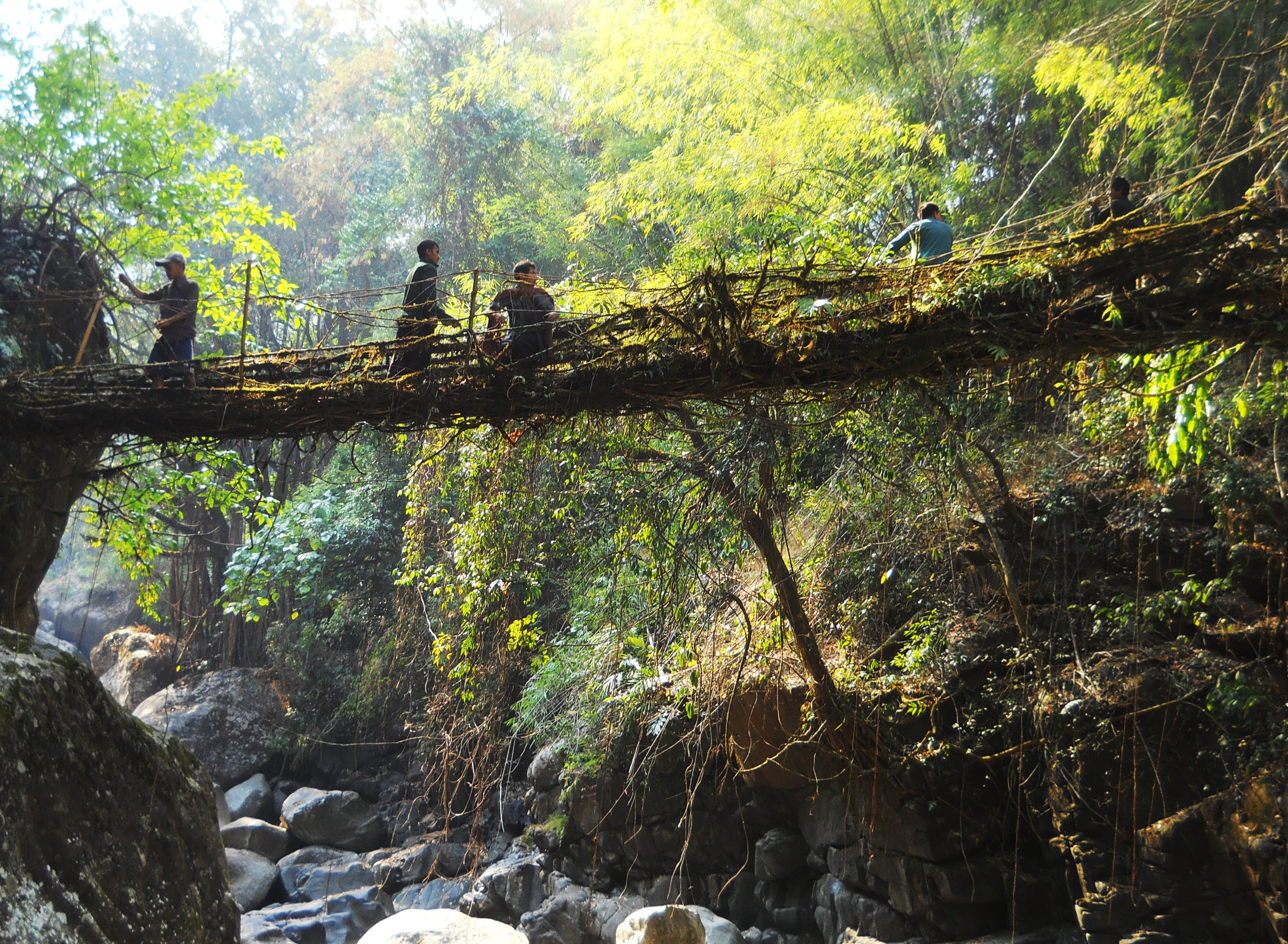
- A living root bridge near the village of Kongthong undergoing repairs. The local War Khasis in the photo are using the young, pliable aerial roots of a fig tree to create a new railing for the bridge.

- Location in Meghalaya Kongthong (India)
- Coordinates: 25.18°N 91.48°E
- Country: India
- State: Meghalaya
- District: East Khasi Hills
- Elevation: 1,530 m (5,020 ft)

Population (2011)
  - Total: 567

Languages
  - Official: Khasi, English
- Time zone: UTC+5:30 (IST)
- Postal code: 793110
- Telephone code: 03637
- Climate: Cwb
- Website: http://cherrapunjee.gov.in/

Kongthong, popularly called the Singing Village, is a village and tourist attraction in the East Khasi Hills district of Meghalaya state in the Northeast hilly region of India. Kongthong, India's entry for United Nations World Tourism Organization (UNWTO)'s World's Best Village Contest, is also aiming for the UNESCO Intangible Cultural Heritage status.

Kongthong is a popular tourist destination known for the panoramic picturesque views and the inhabitants use the whistled language "Jingrwai Iawbei" and build living root bridges. Each native of the village has a unique name, which is a whistling lullaby, and villagers call each other by whistling the lullaby.

== Background ==
=== Etymology ===
Kongthong acquired its popular name the Singing Village from the "Jingrwai Iawbei" - whistling lullaby, where each native has a unique whistling lullaby name for him and her and they call each other by whistling this lullaby.

=== Geography ===
Kongthong village is a serene and picturesque hill village in East Khasi Hills. It lies uphill in remote area between Sohra (Cherapunji) and Pynursla ridges.

== Culture ==
=== Demography ===
The village has a population of nearly 500 to 700 people.

=== Jingrwai Iawbei whistling language ===
People of Kongthong belong to the Khasi tribe who speak the Khasi language - a spoken language. However, Kongthong also has a tradition of assigning unique whistling tunes as the name to each member of the village.

Kongthong is known for its unique language, developed as a consequence of its geographical isolation, in which Jingrwai Iawbei (lit. "melody sung in respect of the root ancestress" in Khasi language) is assigned as the unique name to each newborn by the mother which becomes the permanent identity of the person. This name is not a word, instead a unique call name or caller tune in the form of a whistle, i.e. "the caller hums a tune, which is a unique "name” that can only be understood by the villagers." This naming of babies is a matriarchal tradition in which the mother repeatedly hums the specific musical tune in the form of whistle, which the growing babies gradually become accustomed to. This unique whistling tune or jingrwai Iawbei lullaby becomes the unique name and permanent identity of the person. Every child is assigned a unique lullaby or tune as their name which is transmitted among children and adults as the unique name of the person. All villagers call each other using the unique caller tune assigned to them as a true name. Each jingrwai Iawbei or unique name of a person has 2 versions, shorter and longer.

According to the researcher Piyashi Dutta, who has researched this tradition, "Each clan has a root ancestress. Each time a tune is created for a child, respects are being paid to her. Jingerwai Iawbei is a melody (jingrwai) sung in respect of the root ancestress (Iawbei). There are matrilineal implications attached to this tradition".

There are several folklore about the origin of the tradition, which are centred around "how a man when struggling with some goons climbed up a tree. He whistled the names of his friends to come and rescue him, without letting the goons have the slightest idea". This unique way of communicating has attracted tourists as well as language research scholars from across the world.

=== Religion ===
Inhabitants practice a traditional religion called the Seng Khasi.

== Integration ==
=== Administration ===
The village has a middle school up to 8th class. The village falls under the Khatarshnong Laitkroh Development Block and Sohra Vidhan Sabha constituency, which is a reserved constituency for the Scheduled Tribes (ST).

=== Economy ===
The economy of the village is based on agriculture. Villagers climb down the hill for long trips to markets to sell their crops where they also buy week's worth supplies for the whole village.

=== Transport ===
Kongthong, located nearly 65 km southwest of Shillong, which as of 2017 remains remote as the village but recently connected to a motorable road. Cherrapunji (southwest), Khatarshnong (north), Pynursla (southeast), and Dawki (southeast, a haat and immigration checkpoint on Bangladesh–India border) are nearby larger towns - all of which are connected by national and state highways. Shillong Airport (65 km northeast) and Shella Airport (75 km southeast) are the nearest airports. Mendipathar railway station (272 km northwest) is the nearest railway station.

== Tourism ==
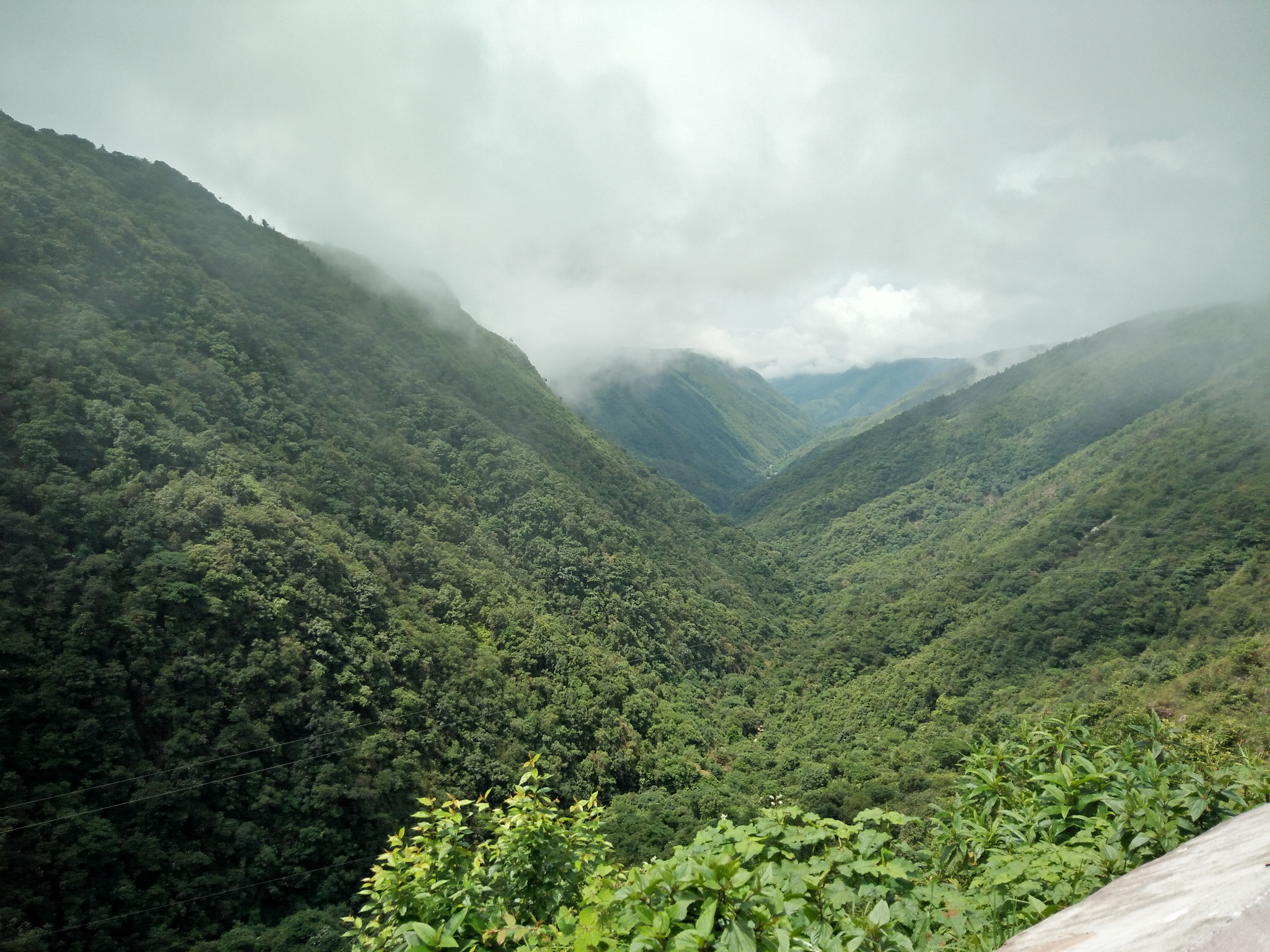
Beautiful view of Mawkdok Dympep Valley.

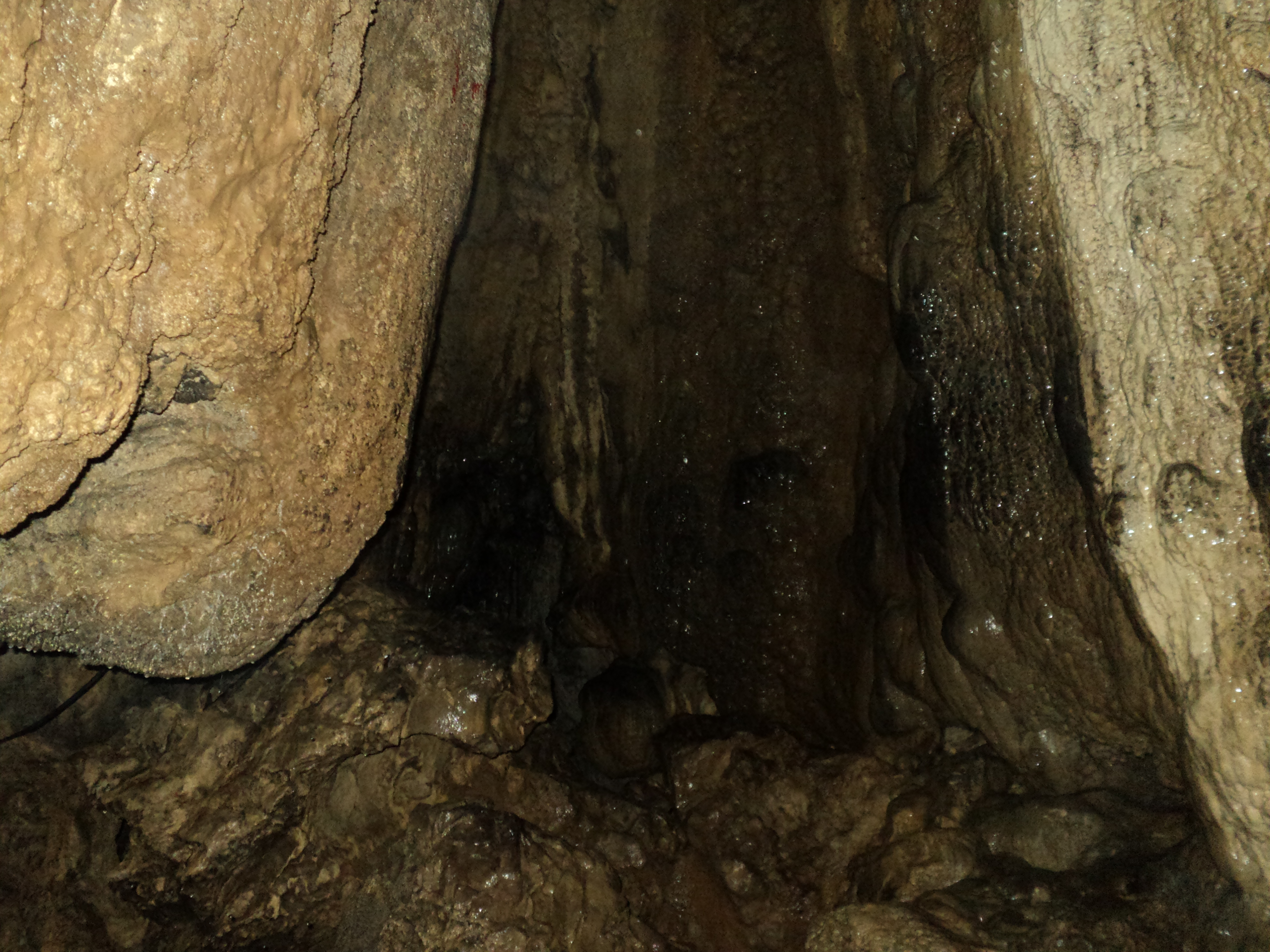
Mawsmai Cave

One can travel to Khatarshnong and then to Kongthong, which winds through hill routes with gorges on one side and cliffs on other and is a remarkable experience. The village is surrounded by panoramic hills, some of which are among the wettest place on the earth with highest rainfall (earlier Cherrapunji used to be the wettest, now taken over by nearby Mawsynram as the wettest). The area has living root bridges, water falls, and geographical formations such as the Jingkieng Myor which is a natural stone bridge connecting two cliffs with Wah Sohra River flowing hundred feet under it.

Kongthong is renowned for its natural beauty and tradition of assigning a singing whistling tune, called the jingrwai iawbei, as the unique name to each inhabitant. Tourists enjoy the Hospitality of the local homestays. "The Traveller’s Nest" in Kongthong, with traditional eco huts, is a community homestay run by the natives which also serves as a base for exploring the region.

Nohkalikai Falls, Mawsmai Cave, Mawkdok Dympep Valley, Laitlum Canyons, Wah Kaba Falls and honey bee farms are important tourist attraction in the area.

=== UNESCO Heritage and UNWTO's World's Best Village ===
Kongthong was India's one of 3 entries for United Nations World Tourism Organization (UNWTO)'s World's Best Village award in 2021. Government of India is also trying to obtain the UNESCO Intangible Cultural Heritage status for the village. UNWTO's The Best Tourism Village award is given to those villages which demonstrate innovative and transformational approach in leveraging the tourism as an opportunity to conserve their heritage and develop their rural community towards UN's Sustainable Development Goals (SDGs), diminish economic and social disparity, reduce the population flight, and conserve and enhance the bio-cultural diversity.

=== Living root bridges ===
The area is known for the living root bridges including those at Kongthong, Nongriat and other nearby places, all of which are tourist attractions.

Sohra (Cherrapunji) and Elephant Falls are other popular tourist destinations nearby.

=== Conservation and development ===
The villagers, who have concerns for the survivability of their unique tradition of jingrwai iawbei tunes as the names of inhabitants, have been demanding an upgrade of the school to higher classes and teaching of the whistling language in the school. Silbo Gomero whistling language in the Canary Islands with 22,000 practitioners and the Turkish bird language with 10,000 practitioners are taught in schools and both were recognised as an UNESCO Intangible Cultural Heritage in 2013 and 2017 respectively. By comparison, jingrwai iawbei, with only 700 practitioners, is not taught in school, thus raising concerns for its conservation. Dr Piyashi Dutta, a published researcher on jingrwai iawbei, highlighted the challenges in documenting this whistling language which is just a floating sound without the lyrics or proper musical scale.

RSS affiliates Seva Bharati and Rakesh Sinha - a member of the Parliament of India, have adopted Kongthong village for development.

== See also ==
- Shillong Teer Khela
- Hill tribes of Northeast India
- Tourism in Northeast India
