= Kickapoo whistled speech =

Whistled language of Texas and Mexico

Kickapoo whistled speech is a means of communication among the Kickapoo Traditional Tribe of Texas, a Kickapoo tribe in Texas and Mexico. Whistled speech is a system of whistled communication that allows subjects to transmit and exchange a potentially unlimited set of messages over long distances.

Whistled language occurs among the Kickapoo Indian tribe living in the Mexican state of Coahuila. It is a substitute for spoken Kickapoo, in which the pitch and length of vowels and vowel clusters are represented, while vowel qualities and consonants are not. The system of whistling was employed around 1915 by young members of the Kickapoo tribe, who wanted to be able to communicate without their parents' understanding. To produce whistled speech, users cup their hands together to form a chamber. Next, they blow into the chamber with their lips placed against the knuckles of their thumbs. To alter the pitch of their whistle, the Kickapoo Indians lift their fingers from the back of the chamber. Among the Kickapoo Indian tribe, whistled speech is employed primarily for courtship purposes. Young men and women rendezvous using whistle speech each evening as a cultural tradition. The whistling can be heard from dusk to as late as midnight every evening. Messages mostly consist of phrases such as, "I'm thinking of you" and "Come on."

== See also ==
- Kickapoo language
