= Kickapoo language =

Dialect of the Fox language

Kickapoo
- Metotheeneniaatoweeheni
- Native to: United States, Mexico
- Ethnicity: Kickapoo people
- Native speakers: 1,043 Kickapoo in the US (2017–2021); 60 Kickapoo in Mexico (2020 census)
- Language family: Algic: Algonquian; Central Algonquian; Fox; Kickapoo
- Dialects: monolingual dialect (Peekaatowaakani); Oklahoma dialect; Mexican/Texan dialect
- Writing system: Latin script

Language codes
- ISO 639-3: kic
- Glottolog: kick1244
- ELP: Kickapoo

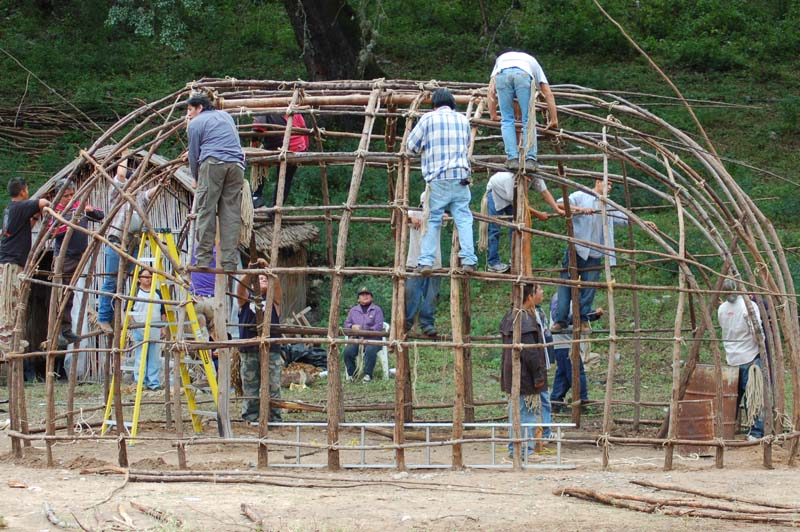
Kickapoo people building a winter house in the town of Nacimiento Coahuila, Mexico, 2008

Kickapoo (endonym: Metotheeneniaatoweeheni) is either a dialect of the Fox language or a closely related language, closely related to, and mutually intelligible with, the dialects spoken by the Sauk people and Meskwaki people. Their language is included in the Central Algonquian languages subgroup of the Algonquian languages family, itself a member of the Algic language family.

== History ==
In 1985, the Kickapoo Nation's School in Horton, Kansas, began a language-immersion program for elementary school grades to revive teaching and use of the Kickapoo language in kindergarten through grade 6. Efforts in language education continue at most Kickapoo sites.

In 2010, the Head Start Program at the Kickapoo Traditional Tribe of Texas reservation, which teaches the Kickapoo language, became "the first Native American school to earn Texas School Ready! (TSR) Project certification." Despite these efforts, there are no children who are first-language users of Kickapoo, as they choose to speak English instead.

Also in 2010, Mexico's Instituto Nacional de Antropología e Historia participated in the elaboration of a Kickapoo alphabet. The Kickapoo in Mexico are known for their whistled speech.

Texts, recordings, and a vocabulary of the language are available.

The Kickapoo language and members of the Kickapoo tribe were featured in the movie The Only Good Indian (2009), directed by Greg Wilmott and starring Wes Studi. This was a fictionalized account of Native American children forced to attend an Indian boarding school, where they were forced to speak English and give up their cultural practices.

== Phonology ==
=== Consonants ===
Eleven consonant phonemes are used in Kickapoo:

	Bilabial	Dental	Alveolar	Palatal (-alveolar)	Velar	Glottal
Occlusive	p		t	tʃ	k	
Fricative		θ	s			h
Sonorant	m		n	j	w	

- /p, t, tʃ, k, θ, s/ can sometimes be voiced [b, d, dʒ, ɡ, ð, z].
- /p/ can be aspirated [pʰ] word-initially.
- /tʃ/ can also be pronounced as [ts].
- /j, w/ may also be heard as non-syllabic vowels [i̯, o̯].
- /w/ can be pronounced as [ʔ] in fast speech.

=== Vowels ===
There are eight vowel phonemes in Kickapoo:

	Front		Back	
	short	long	short	long
Close	i	iː	o	oː
Open	ɛ	ɛː	a	aː

- /a, ɛ, i, o/, can also be phonetically heard as allophones [ə, ɛ~e, ɪ, ʊ~o] and /aː, ɛː, iː, oː/ can be heard as [äː, æː, iː, ɔː].

== Orthography ==
A Kickapoo alphabet was developed by Paul Voorhis in 1974 and was revised in 1981. A new orthography is used by the Kickapoo Language Development Program in Oklahoma.

Kickapoo alphabet (Kickapoo Language Development Program)
Letter	a	aa	ch	e	ee	h	i	ii	k	m	n	o	oo	p	s	t	th	w	y
Pronunciation	ə	ɑ	tʃ	e	æ	h	ɪ	i	k	m	n	o	ɔ	p	s	t	θ	w	j
