= Colfax County War =

1873-1888 range war in Colfax County, New Mexico

- Part of the Range Wars
- Clay Allison kills gunman Chunk Colbert during a meal.
Date	1873–1888
Location	Colfax County, New Mexico
Result	Maxwell Land Grant victory; Settlement between all sides

Belligerents
Maxwell Land Grant Company; Santa Fe Ring	Anglo-American and Hispanic settlers; Ute and Jicarilla	(United States) 6th Cavalry; (United States) 9th Cavalry

Commanders and leaders
(United States) Sheriff Isaiah Rinehart; Francisco Griego	Franklin J. Tolby †; Robert Clay Allison; George Curry	(United States) Captain McCleave

Casualties and losses
- 200 casualties

The Colfax County War was a range war that occurred from 1873 to 1888 between settlers and owners of the Maxwell Land Grant mainly in Colfax County, in the U.S. state of New Mexico. The war started when the new landowners tried to remove the local settlers from the land they had just bought. The locals refused to leave, as they had settled much of their livelihood in the grant, which resulted in conflict and violence in 1875. It has been estimated that as many as 200 people were killed in the conflict.

== Background ==
The disputed territory began as a land grant from the Mexican provincial governor of Santa Fe de Nuevo México to Charles H. Beaubien and Guadalupe Miranda in 1841, which included large portions of what is now Colfax County in northern New Mexico and Las Animas County in southern Colorado. In 1849, after the region was ceded to the United States at the end of the Mexican–American War, an American pioneer named Lucien B. Maxwell moved to the area, married Beaubien's daughter, and became a part owner and manager of the vast land grant. Over the following decades, many more pioneer families arrived in the area, which was conveniently situated along branches of the Santa Fe Trail. Maxwell was very lenient to visiting settlers, allowing pioneers to settle and ranch on land within the grant, letting Ute and Jicarilla Indians to hunt game in the area, and even leasing claims on minerals to miners.

In 1870, Maxwell sold the grant to a group of English financiers for a reported price of $1.35 million. The new owners formed the Maxwell Land Grant and Railway Company. Their arrival and purchase of the land immediately spurred controversy among the people already living in the area, and animosity quickly developed between the two sides. The company was also allied with the powerful Santa Fe Ring, a group of influential lawyers and politicians who controlled many Western states. Property developers working for the company complained that miners and farmers, who they believed were squatters, were disturbing and even harassing their work, presenting various obstacles to the company's production. Many of these settlers were white, Spanish, and Native American people who believed that the land was in the public domain or felt that they had been given Maxwell's unwritten permission to live on the grant.

== War ==
A large meeting between the settlers occurred on March 30, 1873, in which they agreed to arm themselves to protect their homes and property if necessary. In order to dislodge the settlers, the grant hired gunmen in large numbers in the hopes of outmanning and outgunning the former. With tensions finally reaching a boiling point, fifty mounted troops, led by Captain McCleave, were sent from Fort Union to help stabilize Cimmaron. More soldiers would be sent in the following months. The arrival of a notorious gunfighter named Clay Allison further exacerbated tension after he threw his hat with the settlers. On January 7, 1874, Allison and a fellow gunman by the name of Chunk Colbert decided to have dinner at the Clifton House. While at the table, Colbert drew his revolver and attempted to shoot Allison, but the latter managed to draw his quicker and shot Colbert in the head. Charles Cooper, a friend of Colbert, also disappeared during that year and was never seen again.

On June 1875, Francisco "Pancho" Griego, one of the leaders among the Hispanic settlers, was involved in a gunfight with several soldiers of the 6th cavalry. Griego was at the St. James Hotel dealing cards with soldiers when a dispute over money resulted in Griego drawing a pistol and a bowie knife. As the soldiers fled, Griego fired, killing Private Shien and wounding two others. Griego and his family was said to have been blackmailed in exchange for the dropping of the charges. Griego's nephew, Cruz Vega, was later implicated in the murder of Reverend Franklin J. Tolby, a staunch ally of the settlers opposing the Maxwell Land Grant Company, on September 14, 1875. Later that year, Allison formed a mob who apprehended Cruz Vega and hanged him on a pole. The Vega family mourned Cruz's death, and his uncle Francisco Griego, swore revenge. On November 1, 1875, Griego managed to trap and confront Allison in the saloon of the St. James Hotel. As Griego drew his pistol, Allison drew faster and shot Griego twice in the chest, killing him. Days later, Allison was charged with the murder but after an inquiry, the charge was dropped and the shooting was ruled as self-defense. Company gang members retaliated by conducting night-time raids on the settlers, destroying their property as well as murdering those who fought back.

=== Military intervention ===
Because of the presence of a large lawless element at Cimarron and the inability of local authorities to keep the peace, the attorney general of the New Mexico Territory, under directions from Governor Marsh Giddings, requested more federal troops from Fort Union to help Sheriff Isaiah Rinehart restore order at Cimarron. The settlers did not like the incursion of the soldiers onto the land, and this caused a great deal of violence between the factions. Buffalo soldiers of the 9th U.S. Cavalry were among the units sent, and on one occasion, some of them had a shootout with a group of Texas cowboys in the St. James Hotel. Three soldiers died during the shootout and a few months later one of the cowboys involved, Davy Crockett, was killed by the local sheriffs. Clay Allison himself shot and killed a black sergeant in a bar where he was drinking.

A man named Cardenas eventually confessed to the murder of Tolby, and he was subsequently hanged by a group of 20 gunmen on November 10, 1875. A separate gunfight occurred between the Jicarillas and an Indian agent named Alexander G. Irvine on November 16, 1875. Irvine was in the process of distributing meat to the Jicarillas when the latter complained that they were rotten. A shootout ensued, ending with the wounding of Irvine and two Native Americans. Soon, the conflict began to dwindle down between the leaders of each party. Clay Allison was arrested in late 1876 by a posse consisting of a sheriff, a captain, and lieutenant with 45 U.S. cavalrymen. He later left the county in December of that year. The English owners of the Maxwell Land Grant Company foreclosed on the land by 1879, and the company was purchased by new owners from the Netherlands.

=== Last murders ===
In 1885, one of the most infamous shootout of the war occurred in the Colfax County Courthouse. A group led by George Curry was assaulted by a group of sheriff's deputies on the courthouse lawn. Curry's brother and one of his followers were killed in the gun battle. Curry pleaded guilty to unlawfully carrying firearms and was fined five dollars. The Dutch owners also faced financial instability and were sued by the United States government in the early 1880s for making claims on land within the public domain in Colorado.

On March 8, 1887, the company finally sent its plea to the United States Supreme Court. In its ruling five weeks later, the court confirmed the company's ownership of the land when it concluded “We are entirely satisfied that the Grant, as confirmed by the action of Congress, is a valid grant, that the survey and the patent issued upon it are entirely free from any fraud.” Many settlers left the land but some managed to settle with the company and were allowed to stay in the area. Some of the last known victims of the war, settlers Richard Russell and Rafael Valero, were killed in a shootout with company enforcers in Stonewall, Colorado in August 25, 1888. This last phase of the conflict became known as the Stonewall War of 1888, and was participated by settlers from New Mexico led by O.P. McMains. Continued eviction and violence of settlers lasted until 1894.

== Popular culture ==
- The 2005 game Gun had a character named Clay Allison who was also leading a resistance similar to that of the Colfax County War.
