= Clifton House Site =

Overnight trail stop in New Mexico, US

- U.S. National Register of Historic Places
- NM State Register of Cultural Properties
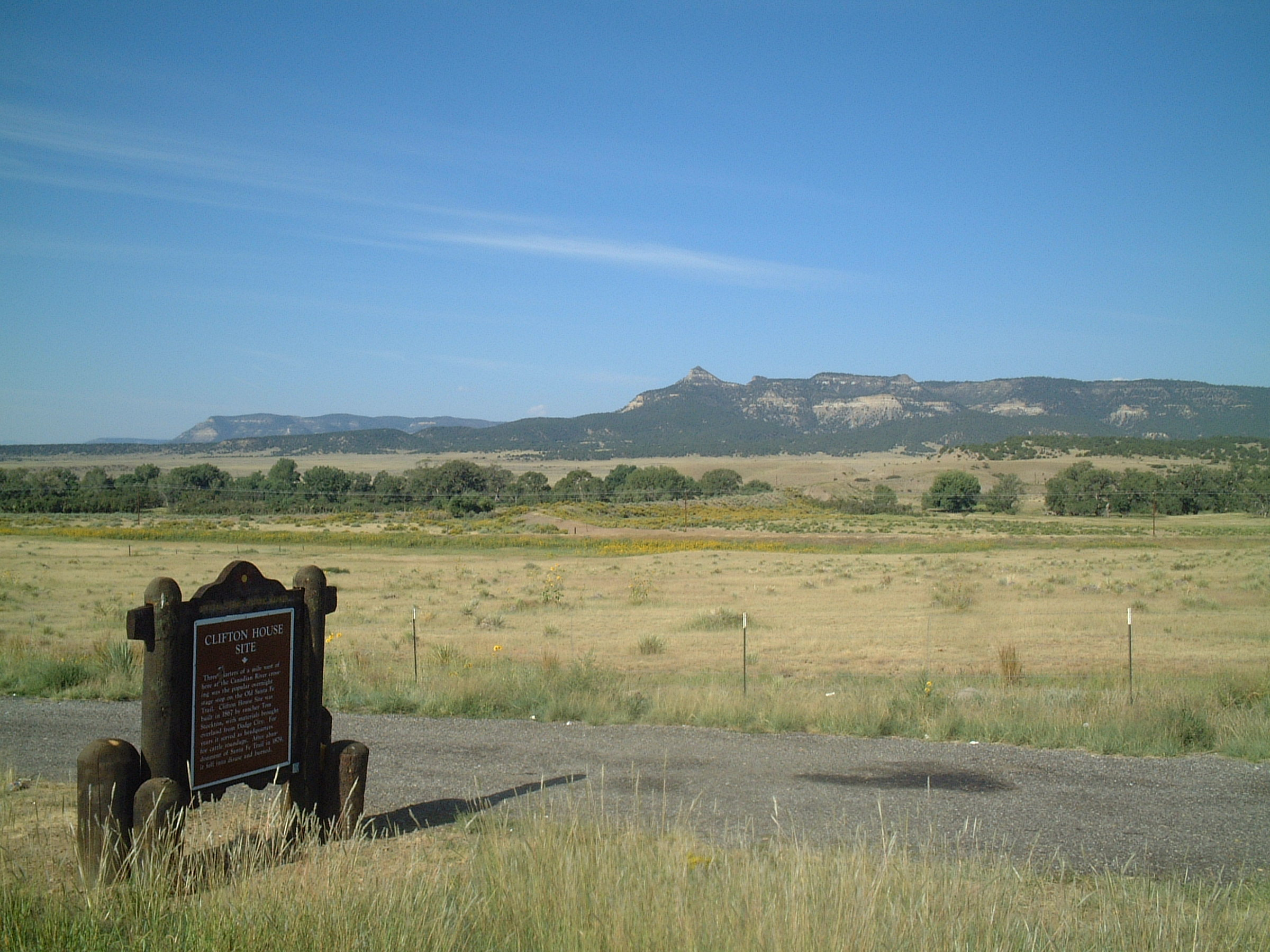
- Clifton House Site in 2002
- Nearest city: Raton, New Mexico
- Area: 2.5 acres (1.0 ha)
- Built: 1866
- MPS: Santa Fe Trail MPS
- NRHP reference No.: 94000325
- NMSRCP No.: 1585

Significant dates
- Added to NRHP: April 7, 1995
- Designated NMSRCP: September 17, 1993

The Clifton House was an important overnight stage stop on the Mountain Branch of the Santa Fe Trail. It was located in Colfax County, New Mexico, about six miles south of Raton, New Mexico, on the Canadian River. The site is located at mile marker 344 of U.S. Route 64, just off of exit 446 on Interstate 25.

Thomas L. Stockton, a rancher, built the Clifton House in 1867, using furniture, glass, and shingles that were brought overland from Dodge City, Kansas.

The two-story building was made of adobe, and had a raised half-story basement. There was a veranda supported by Doric posts along the front and sides of the building, which created a promenade balcony on the second floor. Inside there were washbasins in the front hall. Other features included a large parlor, sleeping rooms with fireplaces, and a high-ceilinged dining room.

Photograph of the Clifton House, New Mexico

The Clifton House was a stop on the Barlow and Sanderson Stage Line, and it employed cooks and waiters to take care of the guests. Eventually, Clifton House featured a trading post, blacksmith shop, and a post office. The area around the hotel grew into a settlement known as Clifton. For a brief period of time, Clifton House was the headquarters for the English company that purchased the Maxwell Land Grant from Lucien B. Maxwell in 1870.

On January 6, 1874, the Clifton House was the site of a gun fight between two gunfighters Clay Allison and Chunk Colbert, in which Colbert was killed. Previously, the local sheriff accidentally killed a waiter at the hotel while trying to apprehend Colbert.

The Atchison, Topeka, and Santa Fe Railroad arrived in Otero, two miles to the north in March 1879, and stage service on the Santa Fe Trail ceased. The Clifton House was quickly abandoned, and the building was destroyed by an arsonist in 1885.

== See also ==
- National Register of Historic Places listings in Colfax County, New Mexico
