= Skirmish at Fort Elliott =

Part of the Texas-Indian Wars

- Part of Texas-Indian Wars
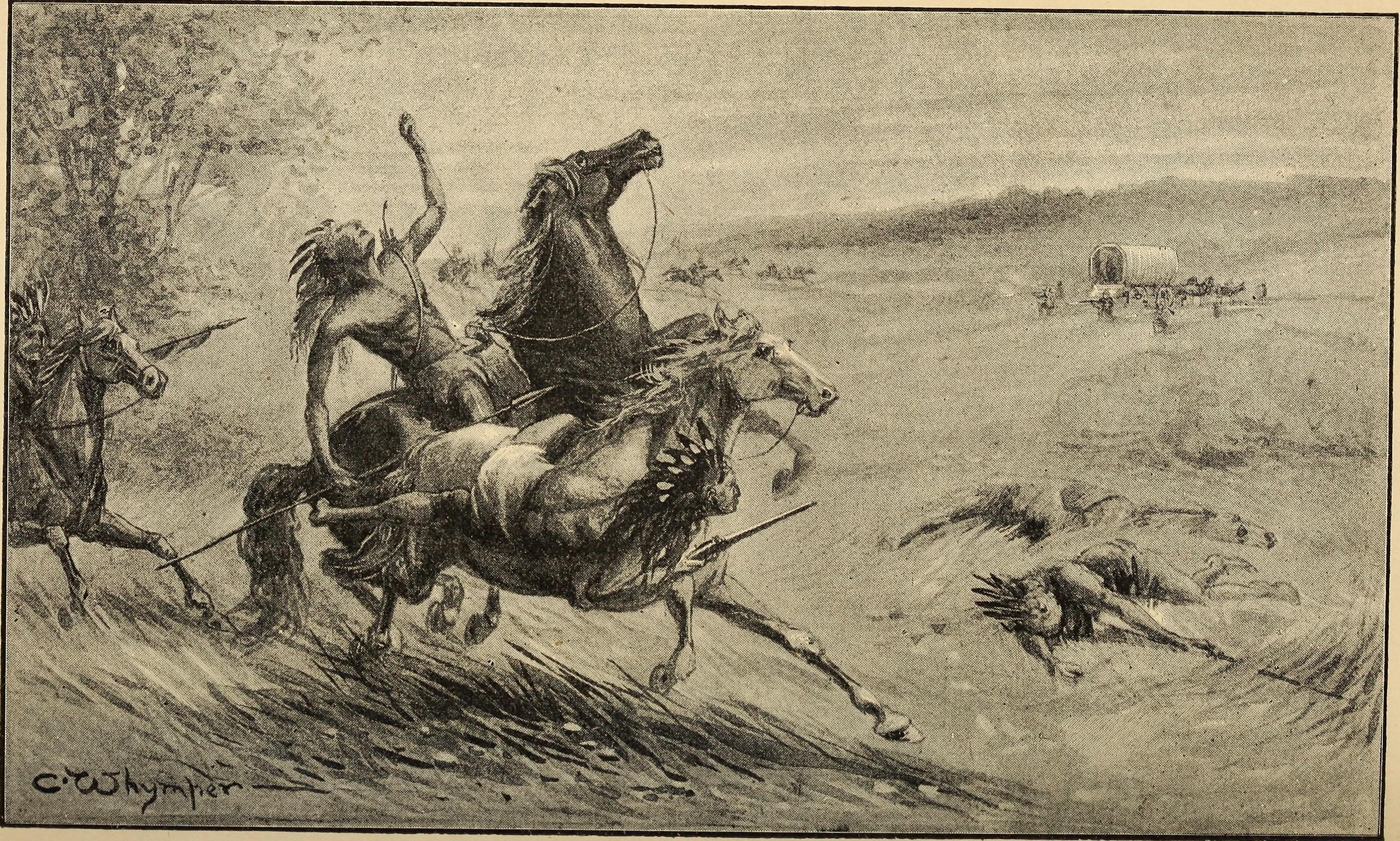
- Comanche attack on settlers (1890)
Date	October 31, 1878
Location	Wheeler County, Texas
Result	Ranchmen victory

Belligerents
Ranchers and Cowboys	Unspecified Indian tribe (presumed to be either Comanche or Apache)

Commanders and leaders
Clay Allison	Unknown

Strength
15	Unknown

Casualties and losses
None	1 killed

The Skirmish at Fort Elliott or the Fort Elliott incident was a minor engagement between Texas ranchmen led by Clay Allison and Native American warriors on October 31, 1878 near Fort Elliott in Wheeler County, Texas. The skirmish was part of the ongoing Texas-Indian wars that raged throughout much of 19th century Texas.

== Background ==
Since the arrival of Anglo-American settlers in Texas during the first-half of the 19th century, open warfare occurred between them and various Native-American tribes. When Texas was annexed by the United States of America following the Mexican-American War, the Native Americans was forced to contend with United States Army besides their ongoing fight with settlers.

Many of these settlers were ranchers who had staked claims in the vast Texas countryside, putting them in direct conflict with Native-Americans who hunted game in these areas. One of these ranchers was the notorious gunfighter named Clay Allison, who had recently arrived in the state following his participation in the bloody Colfax County War in New Mexico.

== Skirmish ==
Clay Allison and a group of ranchmen were travelling together with a company of soldiers from the nearby Fort Elliott, when they came across a house being besieged by unspecified Native American horsemen, presumed to be either Comanche or Apache. The family inside the house had been holding off the Indians since the previous night, but was dangerously close to being overrun.

Clay Allison, who himself was once a Confederate cavalry officer during the American Civil War, requested the company to lead 25 soldiers to rescue the family. The officer refused due to the belief that the Indians have probably set up a trap. Undeterred, Allison requested assistance from the civilians, and 14 ranchers and cowboys volunteered. They charged the Indians and managed to drive them off, killing one of their number. Allison's horse was shot but the family was finally rescued.

== In other media ==
- The account was first published by the Cimmaron News and Press on the same day.
- The skirmish was featured in the book Clay Allison of the Washita: First a Cowman and then an Extinguisher of Bad Men by author O.S. Clark in 1922.
