= Caleb H. Carlton =

US Army brigadier general (1836–1923)

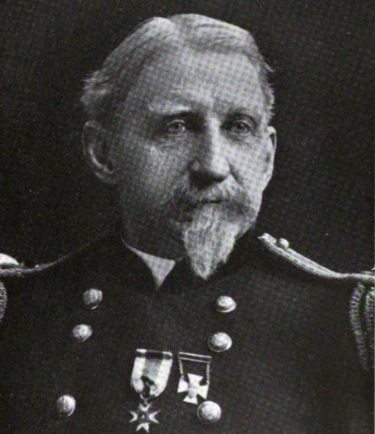
- From 1923's Annual Report of the Association of Graduates of the United States Military Academy
- Born: September 1, 1836; Cleveland, Ohio, US
- Died: March 21, 1923 (aged 86); Atlantic City, New Jersey, US
- Burial place: Lake View Cemetery, Cleveland, Ohio, US
- Education: United States Military Academy
- Spouse: Sara Jane "Sadie" Pollock (m. 1863; died 1896)
- Children: 2
- Military career
- Allegiance: United States; Union (American Civil War)
- Service: United States Army; Union Army
- Service years: 1859–1861, 1865–1897 (US Army); 1861–1865 (Union Army)
- Rank: Brigadier General
- Units: U.S. Infantry Branch; U.S. Army Cavalry Branch
- Commands: 89th Ohio Infantry Regiment; Fort Sidney; Fort Elliott; Fort Sill; Fort Meade, South Dakota; 8th Cavalry Regiment
- Conflicts: American Civil War; American Indian Wars

Caleb H. Carlton (1 September 1836 – 21 March 1923) was a career officer in the United States Army. A Union Army veteran of the American Civil War, he also served in the American Indian Wars. An 1859 graduate of the United States Military Academy, Carlton commanded several Cavalry outposts, as well as the 8th Cavalry Regiment, and he retired as a brigadier general.

A native of Cleveland, Ohio, Carlton was raised and educated in Cleveland and attended Brown University. In 1854 he received an appointment to the United States Military Academy (West Point). He graduated in 1859 and was commissioned in the Infantry. He served in Kentucky, Oregon, and California until the start of the American Civil War, when he was assigned to the Defenses of Washington, D.C. He participated in combat in Virginia throughout the war, and commanded the 89th Ohio Infantry Regiment as a temporary colonel from July to September 1863, when he was captured and became a prisoner of war. He resumed command after being exchanged in March 1864, and he served in Georgia, Tennessee, and Kentucky until June 1865.

After the war, Carlton reverted to his permanent rank of captain, transferred to the Cavalry, and was assigned to posts in Texas, Nebraska, Indian Territory, Wyoming, and Arizona. In January 1892, he was again promoted to colonel, this time as commander of the 8th Cavalry Regiment. On 28 June 1897, he was promoted to brigadier general. He then requested retirement, which was approved on 30 June.

In retirement, Carlton resided in Rye, New York. He died in Atlantic City, New Jersey on 21 March 1923. Carlton was buried at Lake View Cemetery in Cleveland.

== Early life ==
Caleb Henry Carlton was born in Cleveland on 1 September 1836, a son of Christopher C. Carlton and Jane (Stow) Carlton. He was raised and educated in Cleveland and attended Brown University.

In 1854, Carlton was appointed to the United States Military Academy at West Point. He graduated in 1859 ranked 18th of 22. Among his classmates who attained prominence on each side in the American Civil War and the four decades afterward were William Emery Merrill, Samuel Henry Lockett, Robert Franklin Beckham, Martin Davis Hardin, Eugene Mortimer Baker, Norman J. Hall, Allen L. Anderson, Edwin H. Stoughton, Joseph Wheeler, and Abraham Arnold.

At graduation, Carlton was appointed as a second lieutenant by brevet and assigned to the garrison at Newport Barracks, Kentucky, where he served until 1860. He received his commission as a second lieutenant in October 1859 and was assigned to the 4th Infantry Regiment. He performed American Indian Wars duty at Fort Hoskins, Oregon until 1861, then was posted to Camp Sumner, near the Presidio of San Francisco, California. He was promoted to first lieutenant in May 1861, and served briefly in Southern California, where he worked to keep the state in the Union at the start of the American Civil War.

== Early career ==
Carlton left California for continued Civil War service in Washington, D.C. He carried out provost marshal duties and took part in the Defenses of Washington from November 1861 to March 1862. He then took part in the Peninsula campaign of March to July 1862, including a siege of Yorktown in April and May. He was promoted to captain in June 1862 and took part in the Battle of Gaines' Mill in June and the Battle of Malvern Hill in July. Carlton was promoted to brevet major in July, then took part in the Northern Virginia campaign from August to September 1862, including the Second Battle of Bull Run in August. He participated in the Maryland campaign of September to November 1862, including the September Battle of Antietam. He was in the Army of the Potomac's post-campaign march to Falmouth, Virginia in October and November. Carlton performed temporary detached recruiting duty from November 1862 to February 1863, and from March to June 1863 he served in Washington, where he was responsible for overseeing the discharge of soldiers whose enlistments had expired.

Assigned to the Army of the Cumberland, Carlton served in the June and July 1863 Tullahoma campaign and the Chickamauga campaign of August and September. In July 1863, He was commissioned as a colonel and assigned to command the 89th Ohio Infantry Regiment. Carlton led his regiment during the September Battle of Chickamauga, at which he was captured. He was promoted to brevet lieutenant colonel to date from 20 September 1863 as a commendation of his gallant conduct at Chickamauga. Carlton was a prisoner of war at Libby Prison in Richmond, Virginia until March 1864, when he was exchanged. He then resumed command of the 89th Ohio, which he led during the Atlanta campaign of June to September 1864, including the Battle of Kennesaw Mountain in June and the siege of Atlanta from July to September. He commanded his regiment in Chattanooga, Tennessee from October 1864 to May 1865. At the war's end, he was assigned to the headquarters of the Western District of Kentucky in Paducah, where he served until June. On 23 June 1865, he was mustered out of the Volunteers and returned to his permanent rank of captain. He was on duty at Fort Wood, New York from July to September 1865.

== Continued career ==
Carlton was posted with his regiment to Fort Ontario, New York from October 1865 to March 1867. He performed American Indian Wars frontier duty at Camp Augur, Nebraska from March to May 1867 and Fort Laramie, Wyoming from May to November 1867. After an extended leave of absence from November 1867 to April 1868, he was posted to Fort Fetterman, Dakota Territory, where he served until May 1869. He was then assigned as professor of military science at Miami University in Oxford, Ohio, where he served until October 1871. Carlton was transferred to the 10th Cavalry Regiment in December 1870.

In October 1871, Carlton was on frontier duty at Fort Sill, Indian Territory, where he served until March 1875, including an extended leave of absence from November 1872 to June 30, 1873. He was assigned to Fort McKavett, Texas from April 1875 to July 1876. He was promoted to major in the 3rd Cavalry Regiment in May 1876, and he served at Fort D. A. Russell, Wyoming from August to November 1876. Carlton served again at Fort Fetterman, this time from November 1876 to May 1877. He was on an extended leave of absence from May to October 1877, then was assigned as a member of the Board of Survey and recorder of the Examination Board for Superintendents of National Cemeteries. In May 1878, he rejoined his regiment at Fort Laramie, and he took part in scouting missions during the Northern Cheyenne Exodus of 1878 to 1879.

== Later career ==
Carlton commanded the post at Fort Sidney, Nebraska from January 1879 to May 1880, after which he served at Fort Sanders, Wyoming from May to July 1880, including command of an expedition to North Park, Colorado in May and June after a false report of hostile American Indians. He was on an extended leave of absence for illness from July 1880 to June 1881, after which he conducted an inspection tour of national cemeteries. He performed frontier duty at Fort Lowell, Arizona until December 1885, and at Fort Davis, Texas until September 1886. He commanded the post at Fort Elliott, Texas from September 1886 to July 1887. He served at Fort Brown, Texas until May 1889, and at Fort Still until September 1889. Carlton received promotion to lieutenant colonel of the 7th Cavalry Regiment in April 1889.

He was posted to Camp Schofield, Indian Territory in September and October 1889, then was assigned to command the post at Fort Sill, where he served until February 1892. In January 1892, he was promoted to colonel and assigned to command the 8th Cavalry Regiment. In addition to commanding his regiment, Carlton commanded the post at Fort Meade, South Dakota. On 28 June 1897, he was promoted to brigadier general. He then requested retirement, which was approved on 30 June.

In retirement, Carlton resided in Rye, New York. He died in Atlantic City, New Jersey on 21 March 1923. Carlton was buried at Lake View Cemetery in Cleveland.

=== Family ===
In 1863, Carlton married Sara Jane "Sadie" Pollock of Harrisburg, Pennsylvania. They were married until her 1896 death and were the parents of a son, Schuyler and a daughter, Mabel.

== Dates of rank ==
Carlton's dates of rank were:

- Second Lieutenant (Brevet), 1 July 1859
- Second Lieutenant, 12 October 1859
- First Lieutenant, 14 May 1861
- Captain, 30 June 1862
- Major (Brevet), 4 July 1862
- Colonel (United States Volunteers), 7 July 1863
- Lieutenant Colonel (Brevet), 20 September 1863
- Captain, 23 June 1865
- Major, 17 May 1876
- Lieutenant Colonel, 11 April 1889
- Colonel, 30 January 1892
- Brigadier General, 28 June 1897
- Brigadier General (Retired), 30 June 1897
