= Fort Elliott =

- Ghost Town
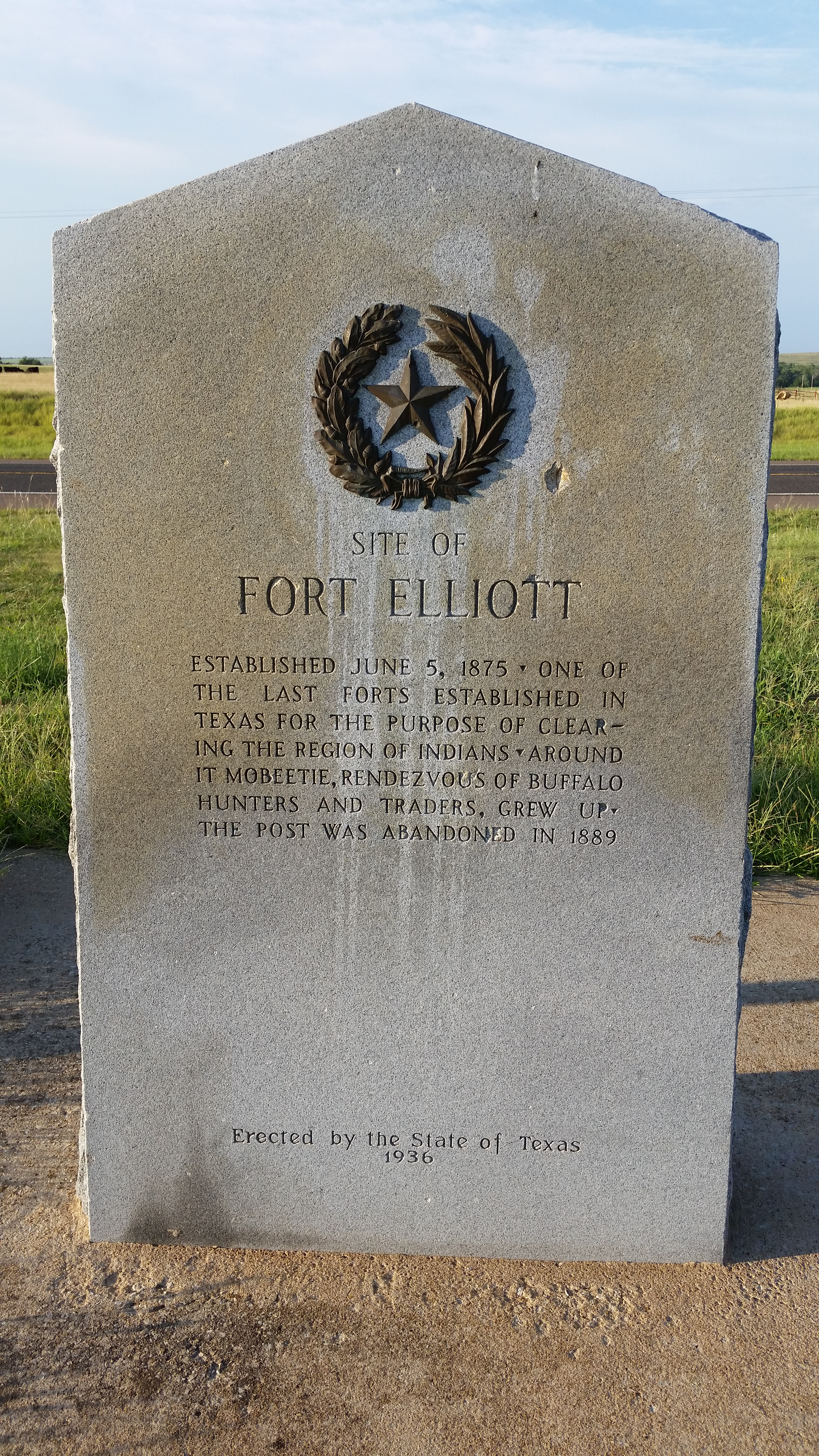
- Texas historical marker for Fort Elliott

- Location within Texas
- Coordinates: 35°31′04″N 100°27′23″W
- Country: United States
- State: Texas
- County: Wheeler
- U.S. Army Fort: June 5, 1875
- Elevation: 2,661 ft (811 m)
- Time zone: UTC-6 (Central (CST))
  - Summer (DST): UTC-5 (MDT)

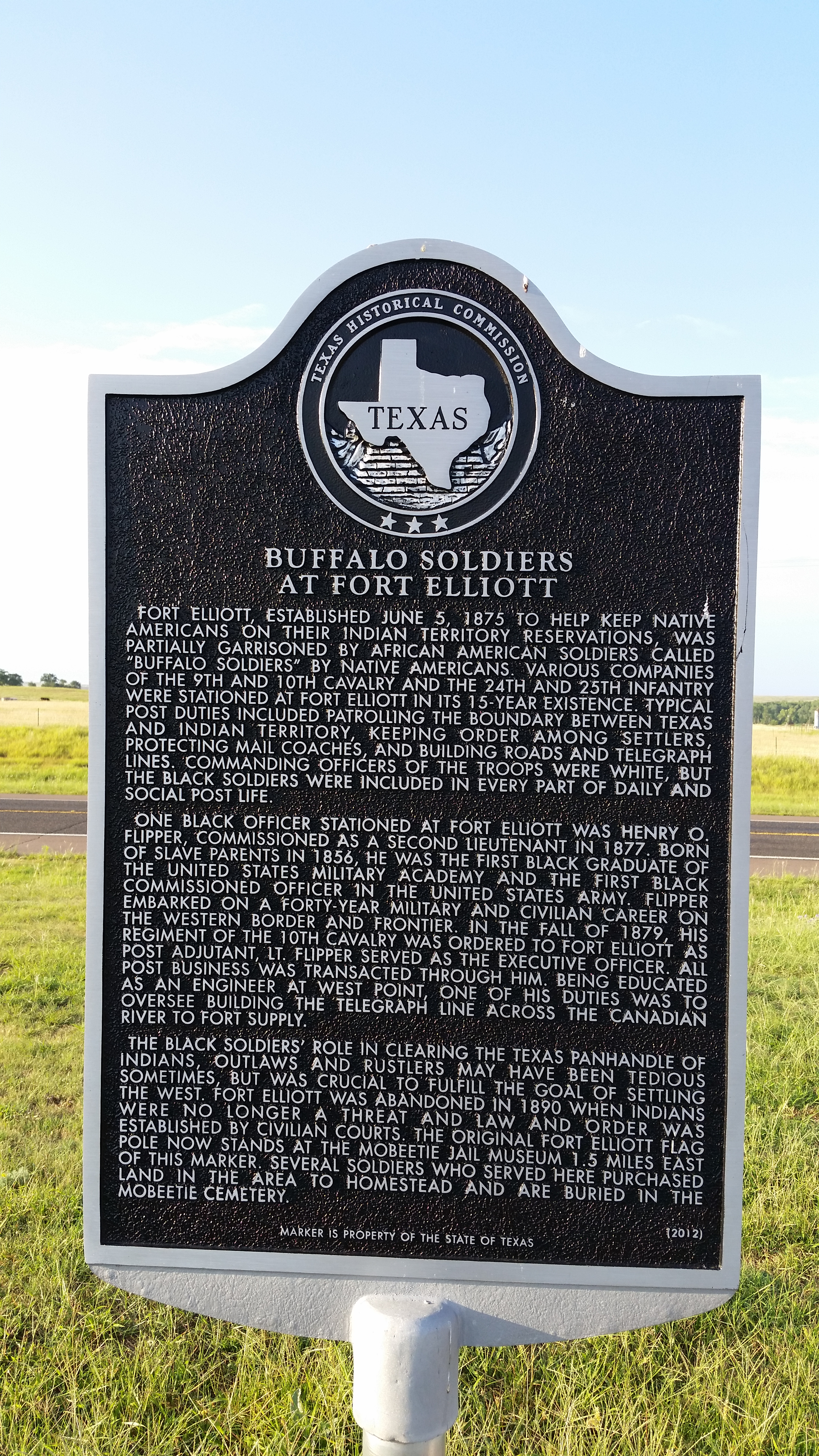
Texas Historical marker for the Buffalo Soldiers serving at Fort Elliott

Fort Elliott was a United States Army post in the Texas Panhandle, operational between 1875 and 1890 and named for Major Joel H. Elliott, a casualty of the Battle of Washita River in 1868.

The decision to establish Fort Elliott in what was to become Wheeler County, Texas, was made in December 1874 by Colonel Nelson A. Miles as an advance supply post during the campaign to clear the Texas Panhandle of American Indians after the Second Battle of Adobe Walls in 1874. Major James Biddle established a temporary post on 3 February 1875 with four troops of the 6th US Cavalry and four companies of the 5th Infantry and the permanent location of the fort on 5 June 1875, twenty-seven miles west of Indian Territory near the headwaters of Sweetwater Creek. African-American troops, familiarly called "Buffalo soldiers," served in this area. In subsequent years, the fort was garrisoned to protect the borders of the Panhandle with Indian Territory, and the cattle drives from Texas to Kansas. The town of Mobeetie in Wheeler County, where Timothy Dwight Hobart and Temple Lea Houston were early settlers, grew beside it.

Among the troops serving there were Lieutenant Henry O. Flipper, the first black graduate of West Point Military Academy, Captain Emerson H. Liscum and Lieutenant Frederick Dent Grant. Caleb H. Carlton, who retired as a brigadier general in 1897, commanded Fort Elliott from September 1886 to July 1887. The fort also became a site of a battle known as Skirmish at Fort Elliott between ranchers and cowboys led by Clay Allison and a band of Comanche warriors.
