= 89th Ohio Infantry Regiment =

- Active: August 26, 1862, to June 14, 1865
- Country: United States
- Allegiance: Union
- Branch: Infantry
- Engagements: Defense of Cincinnati; Tullahoma Campaign; Chickamauga Campaign; Battle of Chickamauga; Chattanooga campaign; Battle of Missionary Ridge; Atlanta campaign; Battle of Resaca; Battle of Dallas; Battle of New Hope Church; Battle of Allatoona; Battle of Kennesaw Mountain; Battle of Peachtree Creek; Siege of Atlanta; Battle of Jonesborough; Sherman's March to the Sea; Carolinas campaign; Battle of Bentonville

The 89th Ohio Infantry Regiment, sometimes 89th Ohio Volunteer Infantry (or 89th OVI) was an infantry regiment in the Union Army during the American Civil War.

== Service ==
The 89th Ohio Infantry was organized at Camp Dennison near Cincinnati, Ohio, and mustered on August 26, 1862, for three years service under the command of Colonel John G. Marshall.

The regiment was attached to Army of Kentucky, Department of the Ohio, September–October, 1862. 2nd Brigade, Kanawha Division, District of West Virginia, Department of the Ohio, to February 1863. Crook's Brigade, Baird's Division, Army of Kentucky, Department of the Cumberland, to June 1863. 3rd Brigade, 4th Division, XIV Corps, Army of the Cumberland, to September 1863. 1st Brigade, 1st Division, Reserve Corps, Army of the Cumberland, to October 1863. 1st Brigade, 3rd Division, XIV Corps, Army of the Cumberland, to June 1865

The 89th Ohio Infantry mustered out of service at Washington, D.C., on June 14, 1865.

== Detailed service ==
Ordered to Covington, Kentucky, September 3, 1862, and duty there until October 5, during the threatened attack on Cincinnati, Ohio, by Edmund Kirby Smith. Ordered to Point Pleasant, Virginia, October 5. Advance to Falls of the Kanawha, Va., October 10 – November 3, 1862, then moved to Fayetteville Court House November 17, and duty there until January 6, 1863. Moved to Nashville, Tennessee, January 25 – February 7. Relief of 83rd Illinois Infantry, at Dover, from attack by Forrest's Cavalry February 3. Expedition to Carthage, Tennessee, February 22–25. Duty at Carthage until June 5. Ordered to Murfreesboro, Tennessee, June 5. Tullahoma Campaign June 23 – July 7. Hoover's Gap June 24–26. Tullahoma June 29–30. Occupation of middle Tennessee until August 16. Chickamauga Campaign August 16 – September 22. Expedition to Tracy City and destruction of Salt Peter Works at Nickajack Cove August 20 – September 10. Reconnaissance from Rossville September 17. Near Ringgold, Ga., September 17. Battle of Chickamauga September 19–21 (most of the regiment captured). Siege of Chattanooga, Tennessee, September 24 – November 22. Reopening Tennessee River October 26–29. Brown's Ferry October 27. Near Chattanooga November 6. Chattanooga-Ringgold Campaign November 23–27. Orchard Knob November 23–24. Missionary Ridge November 25. Pursuit to Graysville November 26–27. Duty at Chattanooga until February 22, 1864. Demonstration on Dalton, Georgia, February 22–27. Tunnel Hill, Buzzard's Roost Gap, and Rocky Faced Ridge February 23–25. Atlanta Campaign May 1 – September 8. Demonstrations on Rocky Faced Ridge May 8–11. Battle of Resaca May 14–15. Advance on Dallas May 18–25. Operations on line of Pumpkin Vine Creek and battles about Dallas, New Hope Church, and Allatoona Hills May 25 – June 5. Operations about Marietta and against Kennesaw Mountain June 10 – July 2. Pine Hill June 11–14. Lost Mountain June 15–17. Assault on Kennesaw June 27. Ruff's Station, Smyrna Camp Ground, July 4. Chattahoochie River July 5–17. Peachtree Creek July 19–20. Siege of Atlanta July 22 – August 25. Utoy Creek August 5–7. Flank movement on Jonesboro August 25–30. Battle of Jonesboro August 31 – September 1. Operations against Hood in northern Georgia and northern Alabama September 29 – November 3. March to the sea November 15 – December 10. Siege of Savannah December 10–21. Campaign of the Carolinas January to April, 1865. Fayetteville, North Carolina, March 11. Battle of Bentonville March 19–21. Occupation of Goldsboro March 24. Advance on Raleigh April 10–14. Occupation of Raleigh April 14. Bennett's House April 26. Surrender of Johnston and his army. March to Washington, D.C., via Richmond, Virginia, April 29 – May 20. Grand Review of the Armies May 24.

== Casualties ==
The regiment lost a total of 300 men during service; 3 officers and 47 enlisted men killed or mortally wounded, 5 officers and 245 enlisted men died of disease.

== Commanders ==
- Colonel John G. Marshall – resigned
- Colonel Joseph D. Hatfield
- Colonel Caleb H. Carlton
- Lieutenant Colonel William H. Glenn
- Major John H. Jolly – commanded the remnants of the regiment at the battle of Chattanooga as captain after the regiment was captured at the battle of Chickamauga

== Notable members ==
- 1st Lieutenant Joseph B. Foraker – 37th governor of Ohio, 1886–1890; U.S. Senator from Ohio, 1897–1909

== See also ==
- List of Ohio Civil War units
- Ohio in the Civil War
