= Clay Allison =

Texas cattle rancher and gunfighter

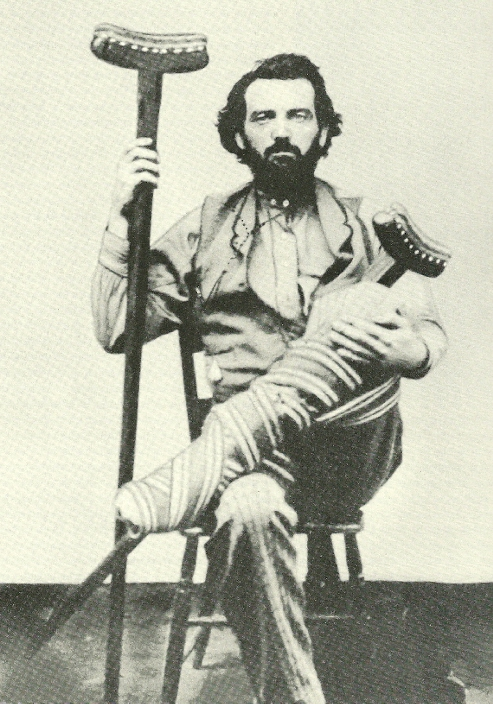
- Born: Robert A. Clay Allison; September 2, 1841; Waynesboro, Tennessee, U.S.
- Died: July 1, 1887 (aged 45); Pecos, Texas, U.S.
- Occupations: Cattle rancher; cattle broker; gunfighter
- Known for: His violence, and for being implicated in many vigilante jail break-ins and lynchings
- Spouse: Medora "Dora" McCulloch

Robert A. Clay Allison, also known as Clay Allison (September 2, 1841 – July 1, 1887) was an American cattle rancher, cattle broker, and sometimes gunfighter of the American Old West. He fought for the Confederacy in the Civil War. Allison had a reputation for violence, having survived several one-on-one knife and gunfights (some with lawmen), as well as being implicated in a number of vigilante jail break-ins and lynchings. A drunken Allison once rode his horse through town nearly naked—wearing only his gunbelt. Later most reports stated that he was dangerous not only to others but to himself, accidentally shooting himself in the foot.

== Early life ==
Allison was born on September 2, 1841. He was the fourth of the nine children of Jeremiah Scotland Allison and his wife, Mariah Ruth (née Brown) Allison. His father was a Presbyterian minister who raised cattle and sheep to support the family. Allison helped on the family farm near Waynesboro, Tennessee, until the Civil War began, enlisting in the Confederate Army when he was 20.

== American Civil War ==
On October 15, 1861, he enlisted with the Confederate States Army in Captain W. H. Jackson's artillery battery. Three months later, however, he was medically discharged due to an old head injury hindering his ability to serve. On September 22, 1862, Allison re-enlisted, this time in the 9th Tennessee Cavalry Regiment, where he served under the Confederate "Wizard of the Saddle," General Nathan Bedford Forrest. He surrendered at Gainesville, Alabama—along with Forrest's men—on May 4, 1865 (at the war's end). After briefly being held as a prisoner of war, Allison and the others were paroled on May 10, and allowed to return home.

== Post civil war ==
Once back home, Allison was involved in several violent confrontations. A popular – possibly apocryphal – story relates that a corporal from the 3rd Illinois Cavalry Regiment arrived at the Allison family's farm with the intention to seize it. After a confrontation and the breaking of his mother's vase (which had been an anniversary present to her from his father), Allison took a rifle from the house and killed the man. Whatever the reason, Clay Allison, along with his brothers Monroe and John, and sister Mary and her husband (Lewis Coleman), soon moved west.

In the New Mexico towns of Cimarron and Elizabethtown, Allison began to develop a reputation as a dangerous man during the Colfax County War. In the fall of 1870, a man named Charles Kennedy was being held in the local jail in Elizabethtown, accused of going mad and suspected in the disappearance of several strangers and his own son. A mob, led by Allison, broke into the jail, took Kennedy from his cell, and hanged him. When Kennedy's house was later searched, the bodies of those missing (including his son), were found. Allegedly, Allison cut off the man's head and carried it in a sack for 29 miles (47 km) to Cimarron, where he placed it on display on a pole in front of the St. James Inn. He believed himself fast with a gun, but this changed when he was outdrawn in a friendly competition with Mason Bowman. Bowman and Allison became friends, and Bowman helped Allison to improve his 'fast-draw' skills.

At one point on October 31, 1878, Allison was entangled in a small skirmish with Comanches during the ongoing Texas-Indian War in Wheeler County, Texas. While riding, Allison came upon a small family home being besieged by Indians. After his request for assistance from the U.S. cavalry was denied, he personally collected a group of ranchers and cowboys to mount a rescue party. They charged at the Indians and killed one of them before the rest fled.

== Notoriety as a gunfighter ==
On January 7, 1874, Allison killed a gunman named Chunk Colbert, who was known to have already fought and killed seven men. After first racing their horses, Colbert and Allison entered the Clifton House, an inn located in Colfax County, New Mexico, where they sat down together for dinner. Colbert had quarreled with Allison years earlier, as Allison had physically beaten Colbert's uncle, Zachary Colbert, when he tried to overcharge Allison for a ferry ride across the Brazos River. During their meal, Colbert suddenly drew his pistol and attempted to shoot Allison; however, the barrel of his gun struck the dinner table, allowing Allison to quickly draw his own revolver. He fired one shot, which struck Colbert in the head. Asked afterward why he had accepted a dinner invitation from a man likely to try to kill him, Allison replied, "Because I didn't want to send a man to hell on an empty stomach." Allison's reputation as a gunman grew, as did his notoriety.

On October 30, 1875, during the Colfax County War, Allison is alleged to have led a lynch-mob to kill Cruz Vega, who was suspected of murdering Reverend F.J. Tolby, a Methodist circuit-rider. The mob hanged the man from a telegraph pole near Cimarron. On November 1, Vega's family members, led by his uncle Francisco Griego, began making threats of revenge. They went to the Lambert Inn (now the St. James Hotel), where they confronted Allison and accused him of taking part in the lynching. Griego reached for his revolver but Allison was faster and shot Griego twice, killing him. On November 10, Allison was charged with the murder of Griego, but after an inquiry, the charge was dropped and the shooting was ruled self-defense.

On March 24, 1876, Three soldiers of the 9th US Cavalry Regiment (Privates George Small, Anthony Harvey, and John Hanson, were killed and an unnamed trooper was wounded) died during the shootout with Texas cowboys and a few months later one of the cowboys, Davy Crockett, who was involved, was killed by the local sheriffs. One garbled version of the triple shooting had Notorious gunfighter Clay Allison shot and killed a black sergeant and four soldiers in a bar where he was drinking. In fact Allison was arrested but released when it could not be proved he had been involved in the shooting

In December 1876, Allison and his brother, John, rode into Las Animas, Colorado, where they stopped at a local saloon. Constable Charles Faber of Bent County told the Allisons they needed to surrender their pistols, as an ordinance made it illegal to carry weapons inside the town limits. When the Allisons refused, Constable Faber left. He deputized two men and returned with them to the saloon. When the posse stepped inside, someone yelled, "Look out!" The constable and his men promptly opened fire. John Allison was hit three times (in the chest, arm, and leg). Clay Allison fired four shots, one of which killed Faber. The two deputized men fled. Both Allison brothers were arrested and charged with manslaughter, but the charges were dismissed as the constable had initiated the gunfight.

=== Alleged confrontation with Wyatt Earp ===
In March 1877, Clay Allison sold his ranch to his brother, John. He relocated to Sedalia, Missouri, and eventually moved to Hays City, Kansas, where he established himself as a cattle broker. When he first arrived in Dodge City, Kansas, on business, his reputation had preceded him. Dodge City was a cattle town, and Wyatt Earp was the deputy marshal at the time. One time, several cowboys working for Allison were purportedly mistreated by the local marshal's office. Earp and his biographer both claimed Earp and friend Bat Masterson confronted Allison and his men in a saloon, and that Allison backed down before them. However, Masterson was not in town at the time and there is no evidence the encounter ever took place. Earp did not make his claim until after Allison's death. According to contemporaneous accounts, a cattleman named Dick McNulty and Chalk Beeson (owner of the Long Branch Saloon), convinced Allison and his cowboys to surrender their guns. Charlie Siringo, a cowboy at the time, but later a well-known Pinkerton detective, had witnessed the incident and left a written account. Siringo's account relates that it was McNulty and Beeson who ended the incident; He further wrote that Earp had not even approached Clay Allison that day.

== 1880s ==
Allison maintained his ranch from 1880 to 1883 with his brothers, John and Jeremiah. Their ranch was 12 miles northeast of Mobeetie, Texas, at the junction of the Washita River and Gageby Creek in what was then Wheeler County, Texas (now Hemphill County, Texas). One story of the time tells of an intoxicated Allison riding through Mobeetie in the nude, wearing only his holster and revolver.

== Family life ==
In Mobeetie, on February 15, 1881, Allison married America Medora "Dora" McCulloch (of Sedalia, Missouri).

By 1883, Allison had sold his ranch and moved to Pope's Wells (a landmark along the Goodnight–Loving Trail), purchasing a ranch near the Pecos River crossing of the Texas-New Mexico line (50 miles northwest of Pecos, Texas).

Clay and his wife had two daughters: Patti Dora Allison (born August 9, 1885; Cimarron, New Mexico), and Clay Pearl Allison (born February 10, 1888; Pecos, Texas — seven months after her father's death).

== Death ==
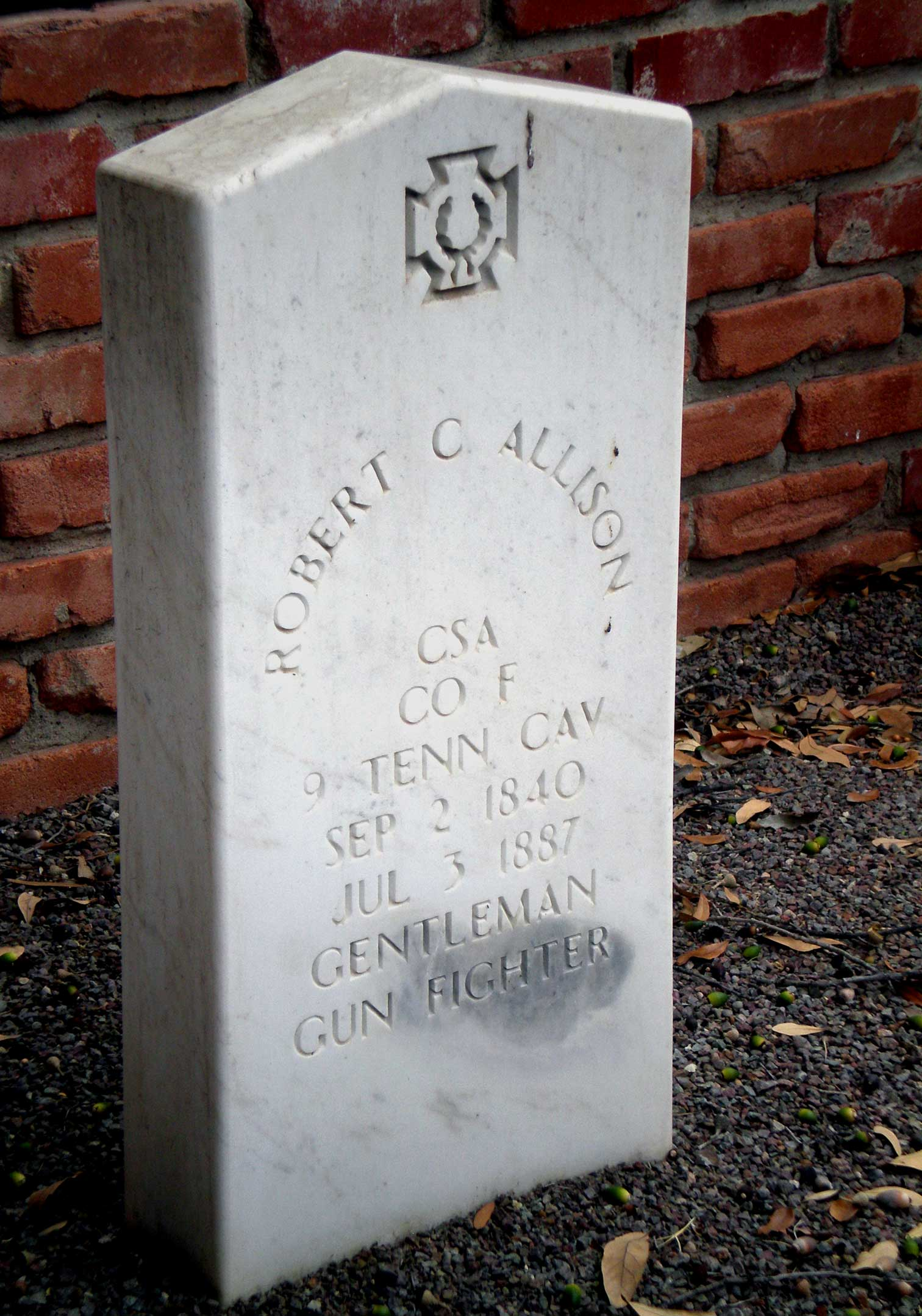
Tombstone of Clay Allison in Pecos, Texas, showing the incorrect birth year

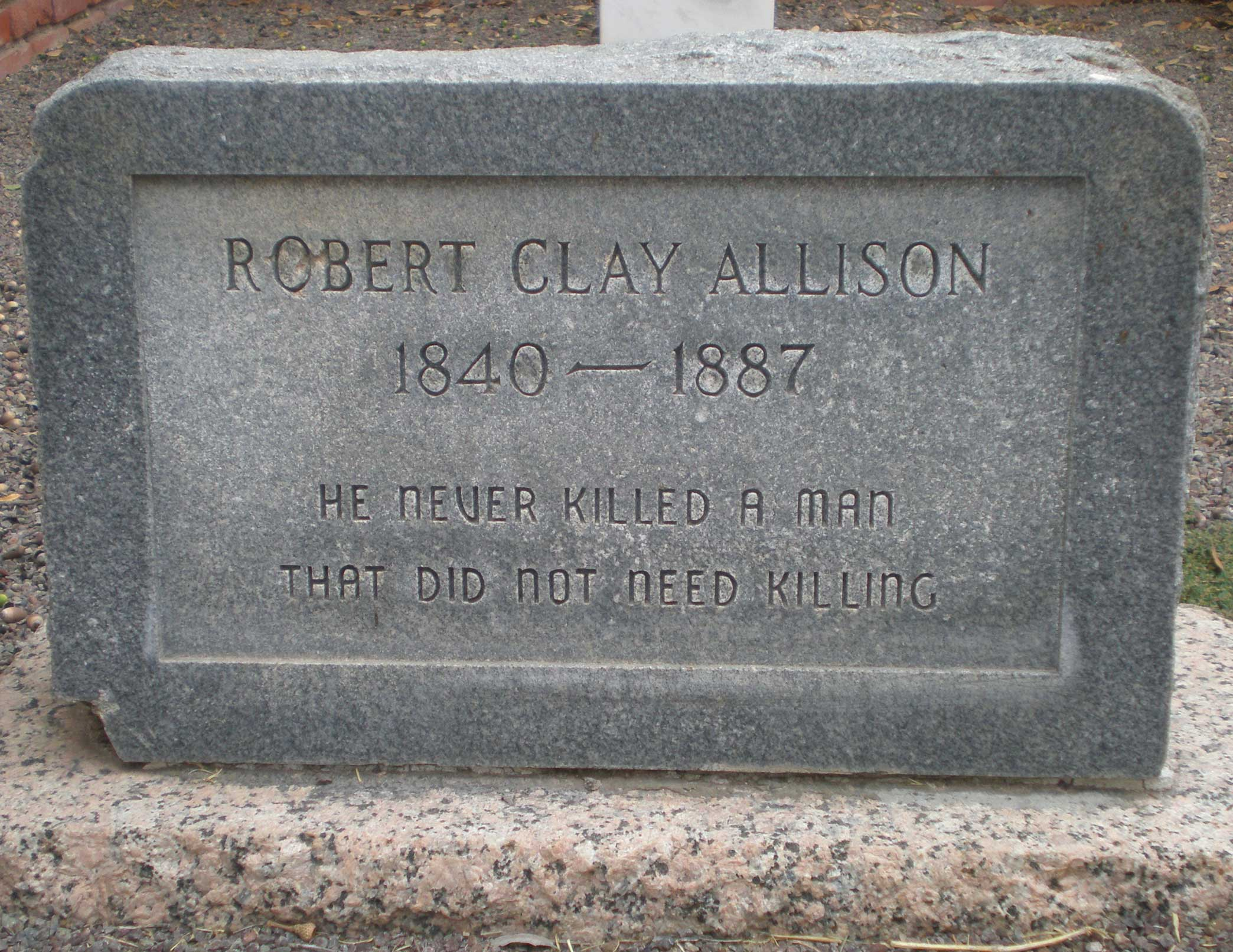
An additional tombstone placed at Allison's grave in Pecos, Texas

Clay Allison died on July 1, 1887. He was hauling a wagon load of supplies when the load shifted, and a sack of grain fell from the wagon. Allison fell from the wagon as he tried to catch it, and a wagon wheel rolled over him, breaking his neck. He was 45 years old. Allison was buried the next day in Pecos Cemetery.

== Tributes ==
In a special ceremony held on August 28, 1975, Clay Allison's remains were re-interred at Pecos Park, just west of the Pecos Museum. His grave marker (which has the incorrect birth date of 1840), reads:

ROBERT C ALLISON
CSA
CO F
9th TENN CAV
SEP 2 1840
JUL 3 1887
GENTLEMAN
GUN FIGHTER

A second marker was later placed at the foot of the grave (see above); with the added phrase: "He never killed a man that did not need killing".

== Bibliography ==
- Clark, O.S., Clay Allison of the Washita: First a Cowman and then an Extinguisher of Bad Men. Attica, Indiana: G.M. Williams, 1922.
- DeMattos, Jack, "Gunfighters of the Real West: Clay Allison," Real West, March 1979.
- Hogan, Ray, The Life and Death of Clay Allison, New York: New American Library, 1961.
- Kelsey, Harry E. Jr. "Clay Allison: Western Gunman," Brand Book of the Denver Westerners, 1957.
- Parsons, Chuck, Clay Allison: Portrait of a Shootist, Seagraves, Texas: Pioneer Book Publishers, 1983.
- Parsons, Chuck, "Clay Allison, Vigilante," Real West, August 1982.
- Rasch, Philip J., "Chunk Colbert, Clay Allison Dined, Chunk Died." NOLA Quarterly, Vol. II, No. 4, Winter 1976.
- Rasch, Philip J., "Sudden Death in Cimarron." NOLA Quarterly, Vol. X, No. 4, Spring 1986.
