= List of wars involving the Confederate States of America =

This is a list of military conflicts that the military forces of the Confederate States was involved in during its existence.

Map of the Confederate States of America including Confederate Arizona

== Key ==
CSA victory (1)
Another result (3) (Note: A treaty or peace without a clear result, status quo ante bellum, result of civil or internal conflict, result unknown or indecisive, inconclusive.)
CSA defeat (4)

Conflict	Allies	Opponent(s)	Result for the United States and its Allies
American Civil War (1861–1865) Location: Southern United States, Indian Territory, Northeastern United States, Western United States, Atlantic Ocean Ulysses S. Grant, Commanding General of the Union Army, accepting Confederate General in Chief Robert E. Lee's surrender at Appomattox Court House following the battle of the same name on April 9, 1865. Following the surrender of Lee's Army of Northern Virginia several confederate generals gradually began surrendering their armies till the wars conclusion.	(Confederate States of America) Confederate States: Cherokee Nation; Choctaw Nation; Catawba; Chickasaw Nation (part); Muskogee Nation (part); Seminole Nation (Western) (part); Comanche Nation (part)	United States: Indian Home Guard; Seminole Nation (Western) (most); Seminole Nation (Florida); Muskogee Nation (part)	US victory: Surrender at Appomattox Court House; Assassination of Abraham Lincoln; Stand Watie the last Confederate General surrenders; Dissolution of the Confederate States; U.S. territorial integrity preserved; Beginning of the Reconstruction Era; U.S. Federal government expands further control over land and railroad rights in the Indian Territory.
Battle of Carrizo (1861) Part of the Second Cortina War, during the Cortina Troubles Location: Confederate Texas	(Confederate States of America) Confederate States	Cortinista militia	Confederate Victory: Cortinistas repulsed; Texas–Mexican border secured
Confederate Apache War (1861–1862): Siege of Tubac; Battle of Cookes Canyon; Battle of the Florida Mountains; Ambush near Fort Davis, Texas; Gallinas massacre; Battle of Placito; Battle of Pinos Altos; First Battle of Dragoon Springs; Second Battle of Dragoon Springs; Location: Confederate Arizona, Confederate Texas, and the New Mexico Territory U.S.A. Company A, Arizona Rangers fighting Apache	(Confederate States of America) Confederate States United States	Apachería	Apache Victory: The Union victory at the Battle of Glorieta Pass was the turning point in the New Mexico campaign and forced the Confederacy to gradually abandon Confederate Arizona and their fight with Apache; The Union continued to fight the Apache Wars until their final victory in 1924
Knight Company Insurgency (1863–1864) Location: Confederate Mississippi Newton Knight the leader of the Knight Company who led a guerilla force of Confederate deserters and Free men against the Confederacy in Jones County, Mississippi and the surrounding counties.	(Confederate States of America) Confederate States	Knight Company	Knight Company Victory: Knight company took effective control from the Confederate government in the county in 1864; American flag over the courthouse in Ellisville; Letter sent to Union General William T. Sherman declaring Jones County's independence from the Confederacy
Confederate Bombardment of Mogador (1864) Location: Modern day Essaouira, Morocco Commerce Raider CSS Georgia (1862)	(Confederate States of America) Confederate States	Alaouite Sultanate	Inconclusive: No casualties on the CSA side and little to no casualties on the Alaouite side
Elm Creek raid (1864) Part of the Comanche Wars Location: Confederate Texas	(Confederate States of America) Confederate States	Comanche Kiowa	Inconclusive/Other Result: Comanche and Kiowa successfully capture all the cattle in the area as well as capture about 10 women and children; Fort Murrah siege rebuffed; Death of Kotsoteka chief Kuhtsu-tiesuat ("Little Buffalo"); African American scout Britt Johnson later saves the captives including his wife
Lowry War (1864) Part of the American Indian Wars and the Reconstruction era Location: Confederate North Carolina Artist's depiction of the Lowry Gang in a swamp from Harper's Weekly, 1872	1864–1865: Confederate States of America: North Carolina; 1865–1874: United States: North Carolina; Vigilantes Bounty hunters	Lowry Gang	Inconclusive/Other Result: The gang was not defeated till after the Civil War, and the Confederacy was already dissolved as an entity
Battle of Dove Creek (1865) Location: Confederate Texas	Confederate States	Kickapoo	Kickapoo Victory: The Kickapoo camp was defended, and its members escaped into Mexico; Out of vengeance, the Kickapoo would do cross-border raids into Texas until President Grant sent a punitive expedition into Mexico in 1873

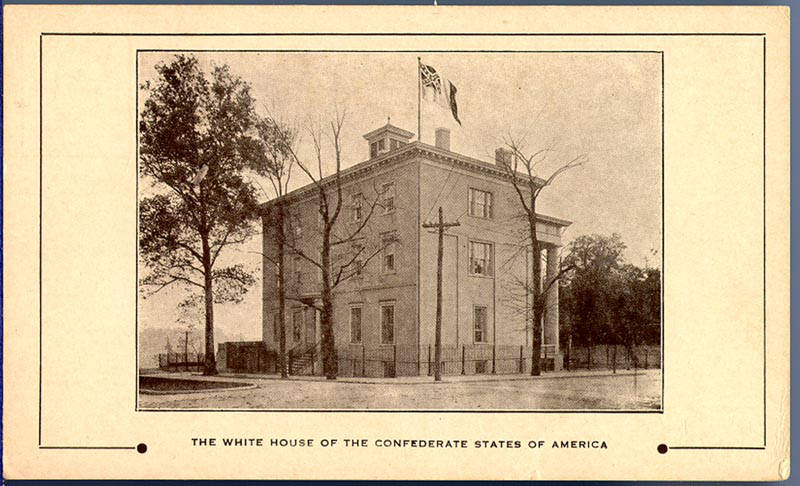
The White House of the Confederacy, the seat of the President of the Confederate States of America in Richmond, Virginia. The president was the commander-in-chief of the Military forces of the Confederate States.

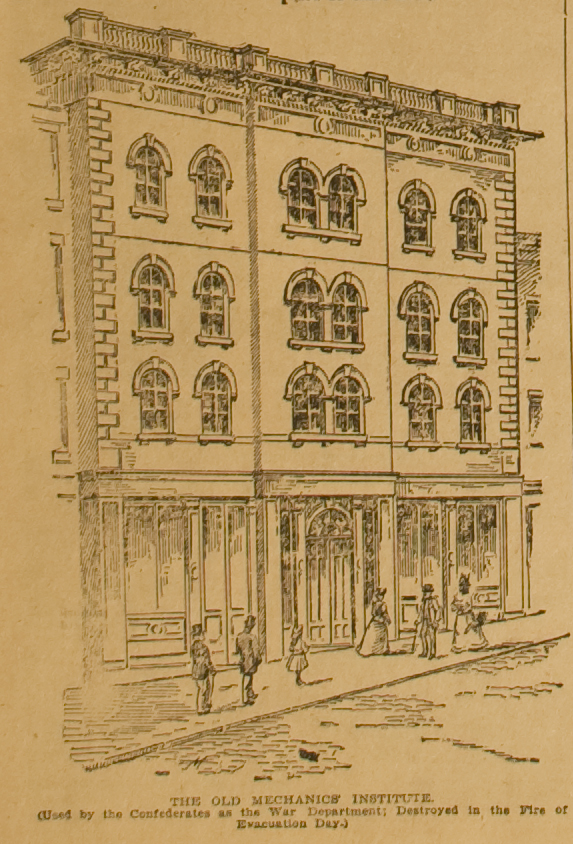
The Confederate States War Department and Confederate States Department of the Navy headquarters at the Mechanics' institute in Richmond, Virginia. From here the Confederate Military coordinated and supervised the 3 Confederate armed services: the Confederate States Army, Confederate States Navy, and the Confederate States Marine Corps.

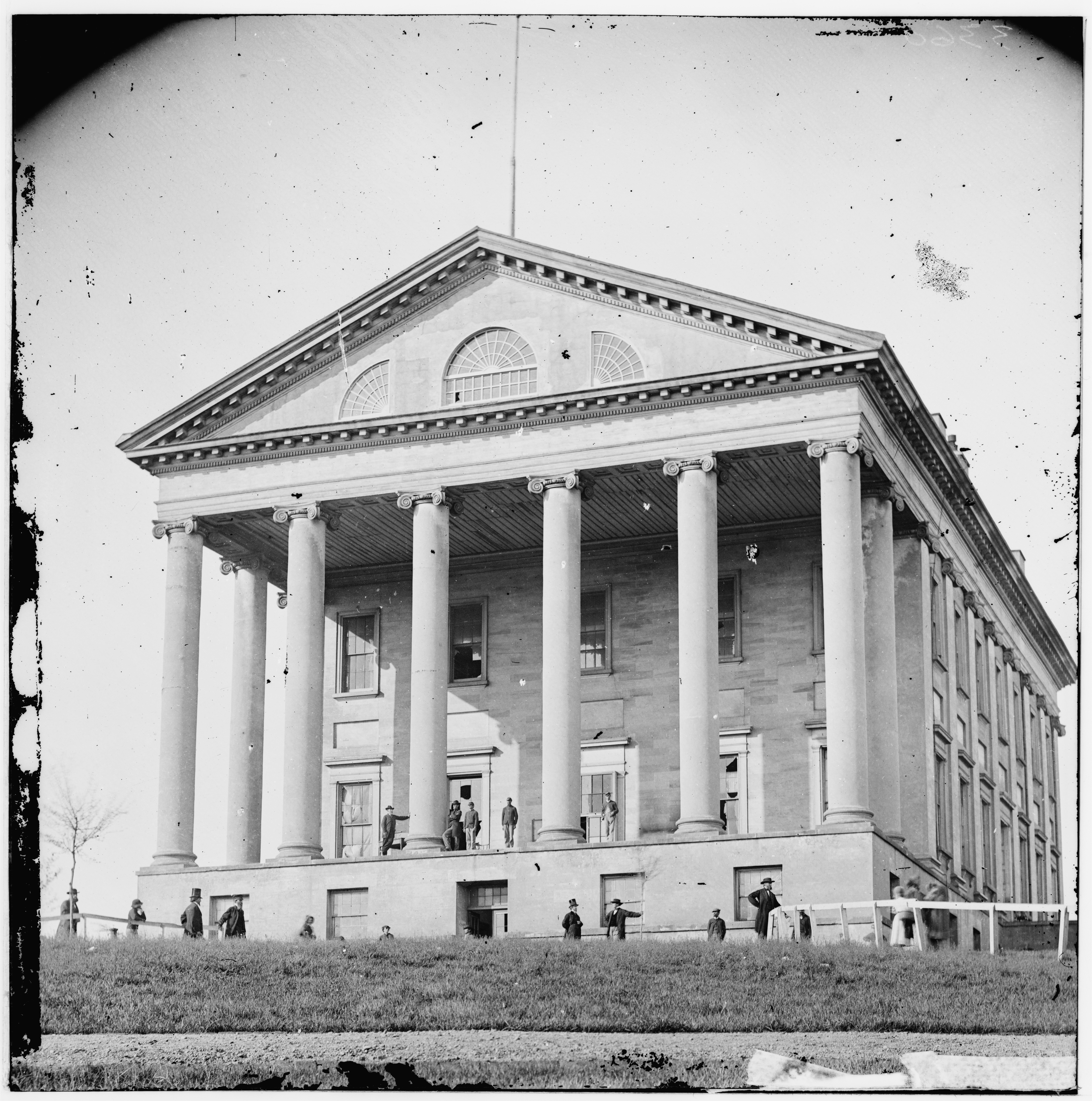
The Confederate States Congress Capitol building, which is currently the Virginia State Capitol building. It was here that the Confederate Legislature legislated war actions, including passing the Partisan Ranger Act and the grossly unpopular Confederate Conscription Acts 1862–1864.

== See also ==
- Lists of wars involving the United States
- Confederate Secret Service
- Territorial evolution of the Confederate States
- Confederate privateer
- Lost Cause of the Confederacy
- Cavalier myth
