= Mexican Kickapoo =

Indigenous people in the Americas

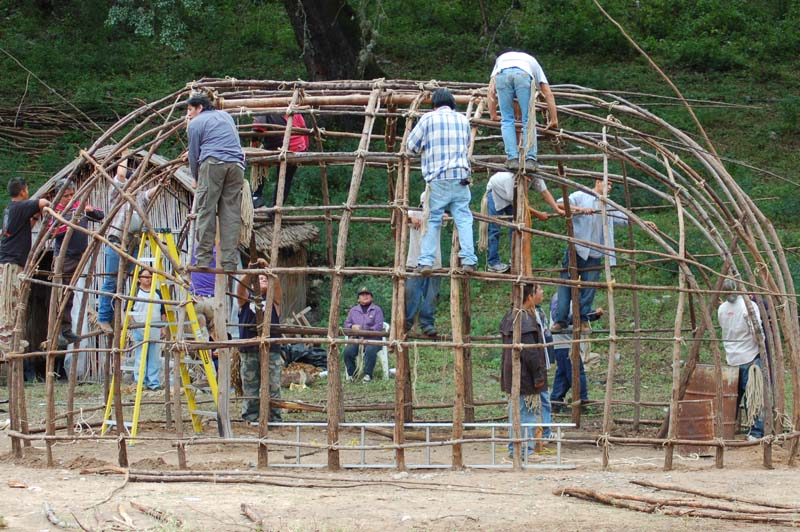
- Kikapú building a traditional winter home (wickiup) at El Nacimiento, Coahuila.

Total population
- 63 (2020)

Regions with significant populations
- Mexico (Coahuila, Sonora, Durango)

Languages
- Kickapoo, Spanish, English

Religion
- Traditional tribal religion, Animism, Drum religion

Related ethnic groups
- other Kickapoo people and Meskwaki, Sauk, and Shawnee people

The Mexican Kickapoo (Spanish: Tribu Kikapú) are a binational Indigenous people, some of whom live both in Mexico and in the United States. In Mexico, they were granted land at Hacienda del Nacimiento near the town of Múzquiz in the state of Coahuila in 1850. A few small groups of Kickapoo also live in the states of Sonora and Durango.

In 1979, the Mexican Kickapoo who were dual residents requested clarification of their status, as they had no clear legal status in either the United States or Mexico. An act was passed in 1983 by the United States Congress, which recognized them as a distinct subgroup of the Kickapoo Tribe of Oklahoma. It also granted federal recognition to the Kickapoo Traditional Tribe of Texas. A 1985 law gave the Texas band the option of selecting Mexican or U.S. citizenship. Some 145 of the tribe members chose to become U.S. citizens, and the remaining 500 or so chose to obtain Mexican citizenship.

== Reservation ==
The hacienda occupied by the Mexican Kickapoo is located about 32 km northwest of the city of Múzquiz, and is called by them El Nacimiento de la Tribu Kikapú (The Birthplace of the Kickapoo Tribe). Their property contains around 17,300 acres of semiarid land sourced with water from the Río Sabinas.

== Government ==
The Mexican Kickapoo traditionally have a president of the ejido (common lands), who is supported by a council of elders for making business decisions, but, a larger assembly made up of the heads of families decides all important, tribal political matters. This assembly chooses the community leadership. They have no representation in local, state, or federal Mexican politics.

== Social organization ==
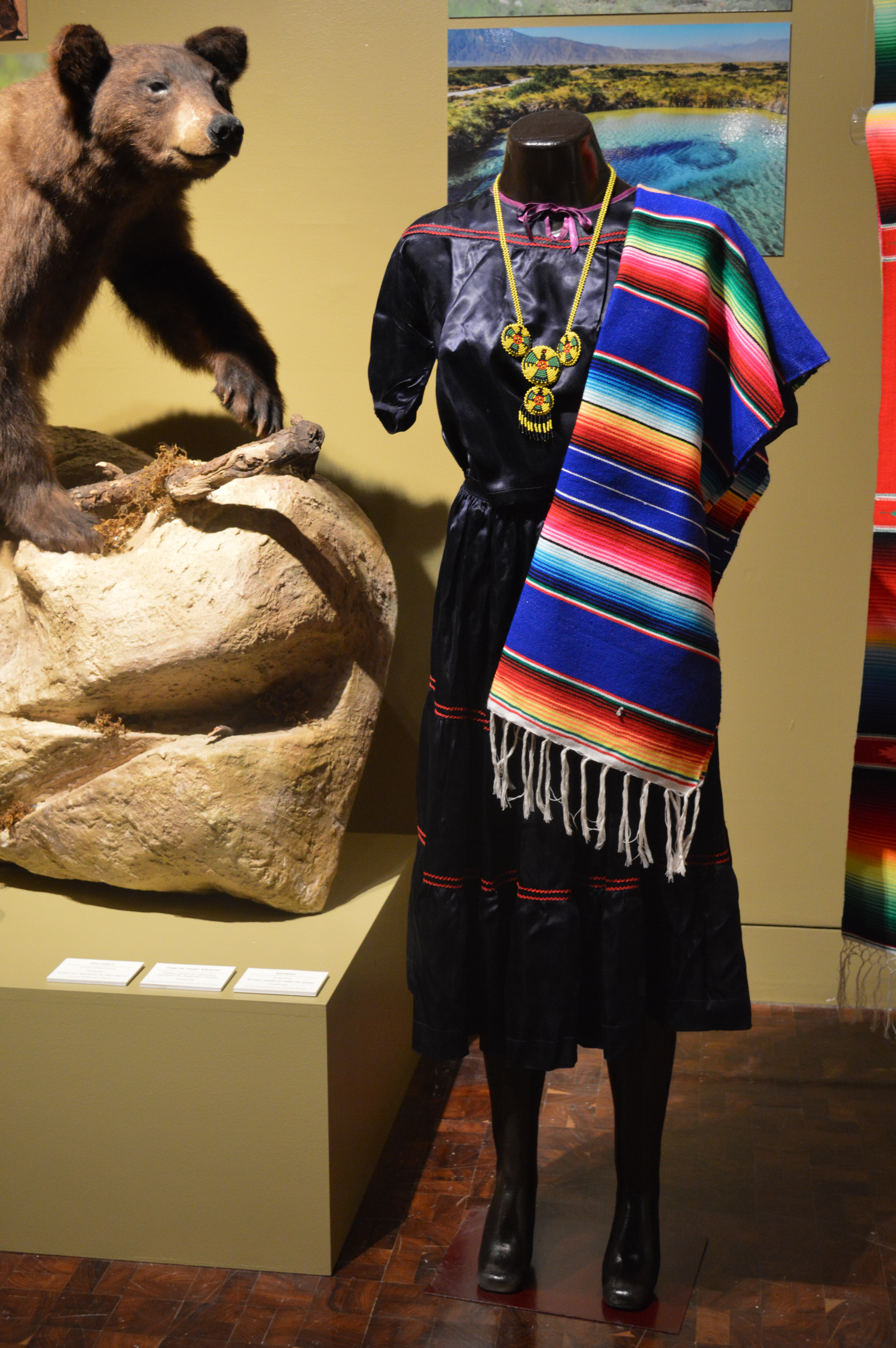
Kikapú woman's traditional dress on display at the Museo de Arte Popular in Mexico City

The Kickapoo kinship system is based on patrilineal clans, by which inheritance and property are passed through the paternal line. Children are considered born into the father's clan. Fourteen of the original 17 clans are remaining: Man, Berry, Thunder, Buffalo #1, Tree, Black Bear, Eagle, Brown Bear, Buffalo #2, Fire, Water, Raccoon, and Fox. Marriage possibilities are based on affection; however, the clan system regulates the possibilities of each individual.

The Kickapoo are matrilocal, meaning that young couples live in housing compounds and living arrangements near the woman's mother and grandmother. Women not only maintain, but also build the dwelling shelters. Women gather the materials to build their housing and are responsible for all housework.

Mexican Kickapoo often work as migrants in Texas and move throughout the Midwest and the Western United States, returning in winter to Mexico.

== Language ==
The Mexican Kickapoo speak the Kickapoo language, which is a Fox language, part of the large Algonquian languages family. They also speak Spanish and English; typically, these are not learned in school, but rather through exposure.

== Economic development ==
Traditionally a hunter-gatherer people, in the early 20th century, the Kickapoo began switching to agriculture. By the 1930s, they had developed a modern system of farming. Due to significant droughts in the 1940s, the Kickapoo became migrant farm workers in the United States, abandoning agriculture on their own land. In the 1950s, they began transforming their own farms into grazing lands for cattle raising.

Both men and women do migrant farm labor. When they are living in Mexico, only the men participate in the livestock trade.

== History ==
=== Northern origins ===
Kickapoo comes from their word Kiwigapawa, which roughly translates into "he moves from here to there." The tribe is part of the central Algonquian group, and has close ethnic and linguistic connections with the Sac and Meskwaki. The Kickapoo were first recorded by Europeans in about 1667-70 as residing at the portage between the Fox and Wisconsin Rivers. Under pressure from the Menominee, the Kickapoo and their allies moved south and west into southern Michigan, Ohio, Illinois, and northern Iowa.

A treaty dated 7 June 1803 between the U.S. government and the Delaware, Shawnee, Potawatomi, Miami, Eel River, Wea, Kickapoo, Piankeshaw, and Kaskaskia tribes occupying the country watered by the Ohio, Wabash, and Miami Rivers and a subsequent treaty dated 7 August 1803 ceded lands previously granted in the Treaty of Greenville in 1795 by General Anthony Wayne, and Fort Wayne and Vincennes, Indiana. By these treaties and succeeding treaties in 1809, 1815, 1816, 1819, and 1820 the tribe ceded all their lands on the Wabash, White and Vermilion rivers and moved into Missouri along the Osage River.

=== Resettlement on the Plains ===
In 1832, the tribe ceded their lands in Missouri and were granted a "permanent" home south of the Delaware Nation in Kansas near Fort Leavenworth. Around the same time as the Kickapoo moved into Kansas, some of them went to Texas, invited to settle there by the Spanish colonial governor to serve as a buffer between Mexico and American expansionists. The Mexican War of Independence and the Texas Revolution proved that the tide of settlers would not be stopped by the few hundred Kickapoo. At the conclusion of the Texas Revolution, these groups moved south into Mexico. In 1854, the tribe ceded the eastern portion of the Kansas lands to the United States, leaving the Kickapoo the western 150,000 acres. Two provisions of this treaty were to have long-lasting effects on the tribe. The treaty authorized a survey of the Kickapoo lands, which could be used as the basis for fee-simple allotment, and it granted a railroad right-of-way across the reservation.

Using these two clauses as a basis, the local Indian agent, William Badger, convinced the Commissioner of Indian Affairs Charles E. Mix that the Kickapoo wanted to have their communal lands allotted to individual households. Considering that the tribe had always held their lands in common, it is unlikely that the tribe wanted such allotment. However, in light of Badger's persuasiveness, Mix directed that allotment proceed if the Indians paid for the costs of surveying and allotting the land, 80 acres was allotted to each head of household, and any lands remaining after allotment of the Kansas Kickapoo be reserved for resettlement of the Mexican Kickapoo. Holding the lands not allotted for the Southern Kickapoo was not in the interests of the railroad, and Badger began pressuring tribal members for allotment. Though they complained, a change in presidential administrations due to a national election resulted in Badger being replaced in office in 1861 by his brother-in-law, Charles B. Keith.

Keith was a political ally of Senator Samuel C. Pomeroy, who was the president of the Atchison and Pike's Peak Railroad. This was the central section of the transcontinental railroad, which had been formed in 1859. The railroad wanted to gain the right-of-way across the Kickapoo Reservation and title to any surplus lands when the reservation was allotted. Pomeroy and Keith both met with and wrote letters to Commissioner Mix urging allotment, and by 1862, the US made a new treaty with the Kickapoo.

The 28 June 1862 agreement allowed for chiefs to receive 320-acre plots, heads of households to receive 160 acres, and all other tribe members to get 40 acres each, with the bulk of the remaining 125,000 acres to be sold to the railroad. Those who chose not to accept allotment could continue to hold their lands in common until such time as an arrangement could be made to locate a new reserve in Indian Territory, later Oklahoma. Any Southern Kickapoos had one year to return to Kansas and take up their allotments, or they would be forfeited. When news broke that the treaty was approved, protest erupted.

The Kickapoo said that they were unaware that the agreement had been reached and thought that they were still negotiating terms. The Kansas Attorney General, Warren William Guthrie, launched a grand-jury hearing. The charges were considered serious enough that allotment was suspended and the new Commissioner of Indian Affairs, William P. Dole, appointed in 1863, traveled to Kansas to investigate. In the hearings that followed, allegations were made that Guthrie's real interest in the matter stemmed from his involvement with a rival railroad, the Hannibal and St. Joseph Railroad Corporation. Dole returned to Washington, DC, and submitted his report to President Lincoln on 4 April 1864. Some of the frustrated Kickapoo decided to leave Kansas, and a group of about 700 headed for Mexico in September 1864 to join kinsmen there. In January, 1865 a delegation of Kickapoo travelled to Mexico City to meet with the government of the newly established Second Mexican Empire to seek land rights as well as protection from attacks by American soldiers and rival tribes against their territory near the Rio Grande.

In 1865 pressure from Pomeroy finally gained the approval to continue with the Kickapoo allotment, though the tribe resisted. By 1869, only 93 Kansas Kickapoo had accepted fee-simple allotment, the remainder preferring to continue holding their lands in common. A small band, about 50 tribesmen, returned from Mexico to the Kansas Reservation before the forfeit period lapsed. They settled on the common lands briefly, but left before claiming their allotments. They later joined the Kickapoo in Indian Territory in 1874. In 1875, a group of 114 of the Mexican Kickapoo were returned to the Kansas Reservation.

=== Texas Settlement ===
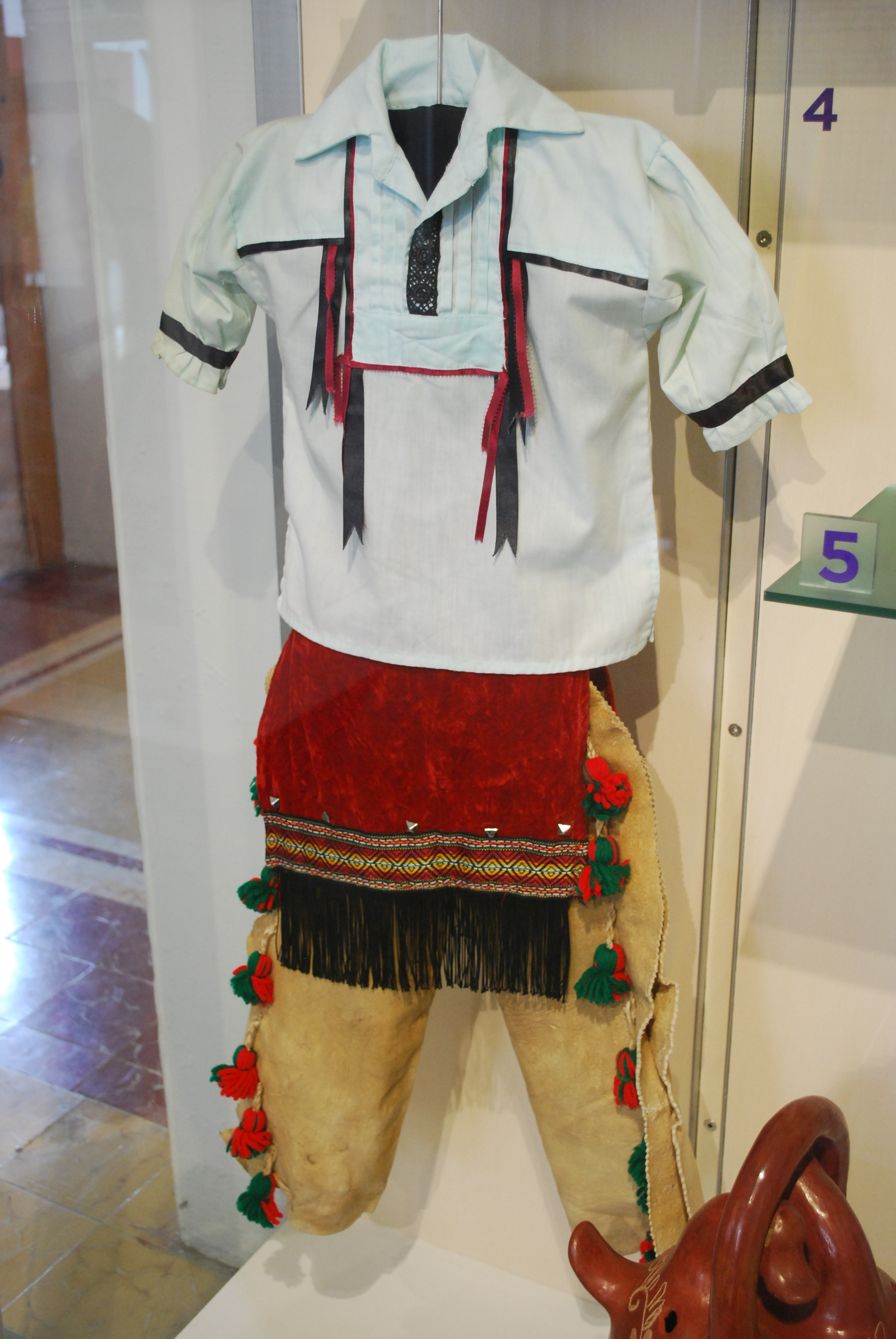
Kikapú boy's ceremonial dress on display at the Centro de Desarrollo Artesanal Indígena in Santiago de Querétaro

The first Southern Kickapoo migration occurred around the time that the tribe was settled in Kansas. They traveled across the Great Plains, fighting the Seminole in Florida around 1837 and traveled into Texas in search of horses from the Comanche. In 1850, they agreed to act as a buffer between Mexicans, invading Texas settlers, and the Lipan, Comanche, and other tribes in northern Coahuila. As a reward for their service, the Mexican governor awarded them a land grant at Hacienda del Nacimiento near the settlement of Santa Rosa (now known as Múzquiz). At the peak of their strength, the southern Kickapoo, numbered about 1500, and by 1860 were living in a swath from the Canadian and Washita Rivers in Indian Territory to the Sabine and Brazos Rivers in Texas to the Remolino River in northern Mexico.

In 1864, about 700 Kickapoo, frustrated with the duplicitous actions of agents and their railroad colleagues in Kansas, left to join their kinsmen in Mexico. The Kickapoo who left Kansas in the fall of 1864 were led by chiefs Pecan, Papicua, and Nokohat. Confederate scouts picked up their trail and reported their findings to Captain Henry Fossett and Captain S. S. Totten, leader of a group of Texas militiamen.

On 8 January 1865, the Texans charged the Kickapoo at Dove Creek, were engaged in battle for a brief half-hour, and then retreated. The Kickapoo had lost about 15 warriors and the Texans twice as many men. In 1868, a report to the Commissioner of Indian Affairs indicated that roughly 800 Kickapoo were living in Mexico. It said that the Mexican Kickapoo were responsible for raids in the western part of Texas. In an effort to pacify the Texas residents and ward off difficulties with Mexico, the U.S. determined to retrieve the Kickapoo.

Congress passed P.L. 16 Stat. 359 an Act of 15 July 1870 to appropriate funds for the Secretary of the Interior to collect Kickapoo in Texas and Mexico and establish them on land in the Indian Territory. A second Act, P.L. 16 Stat. 569, passed by Congress on 3 March 1871, appropriated funds for the resettlement and subsistence of the Kickapoo on reservations within the United States. Armed with these two acts, Indian Agent John DeBras Miles, went with a delegation of Kansas Kickapoo to try to persuade the Indians at Santa Rosa to return to the United States. Mexican authorities refused to allow Miles to speak with the Kickapoo, as the residents of Santa Rosa thought they were the only defense against other marauding tribes.

In 1873, after complaints were received that Mexican authorities were using the Kickapoo to hide the theft of Texas cattle by Mexicans, the US made another attempt to bring the Kickapoo to Indian Territory. Special Agents H. M. Atkinson and Col. T. G. Williams went to Saltillo, to negotiate directly with Governor Victoriano Cepeda Camacho. Though citizens and the Legislature of Coahuila did not support the action, Cepeda appointed an officer to assist the agents and gave him a proclamation that they were to be assisted by the officials and citizenry. While the delegation was en route to Santa Rosa, a party of Americans under the command of General MacKenzie attacked the Kickapoo, thinking that they were a group of raiding Lipan. The Kickapoo were not interested in hearing from the US agents. In the autumn of 1874, Atkinson and Williams finally persuaded a group of about 300 Kickapoo to resettle in Indian Territory.

=== Relocation to Indian Territory/Oklahoma ===
The Mexican Kickapoos were to be removed to the Indian Territory to a site on the north fork of the Canadian River. They were to be provided with farm equipment to begin cultivation for subsistence farming. The adjustment was difficult, and by 1883, they had still not been provided with a permanent title to the lands they were occupying. By an executive order issued 15 August 1883, the Kickapoo were granted the lands that they had been occupying near the southwest corner of the Sac and Fox Reservation. This territory had been ceded in 1866 by the Muscogee (Creek) Nation, under a new treaty with the US after the Civil War, for resettlement of Creek freedmen and others. Four years later, passage of the Dawes Act created pressure to make allotments of communal lands and secure fee-simple title for the Oklahoma Kickapoo. On 21 June 1891 the tribe agreed to cede their reservation in exchange for 80-acre allotments for each tribesman. The Kickapoo were "bitterly opposed" to allotment and fought the process until 1894. They were right to be resistant, as it resulted in their losing large blocks of land.

== Notable citizens ==
- Emma Kickapoo (1880–1942), baker and model
