= Kickapoo Tribe of Oklahoma =

Federally recognized Kickapoo tribe in Oklahoma

Kii Kaa Poa, Kii Kaa Poi
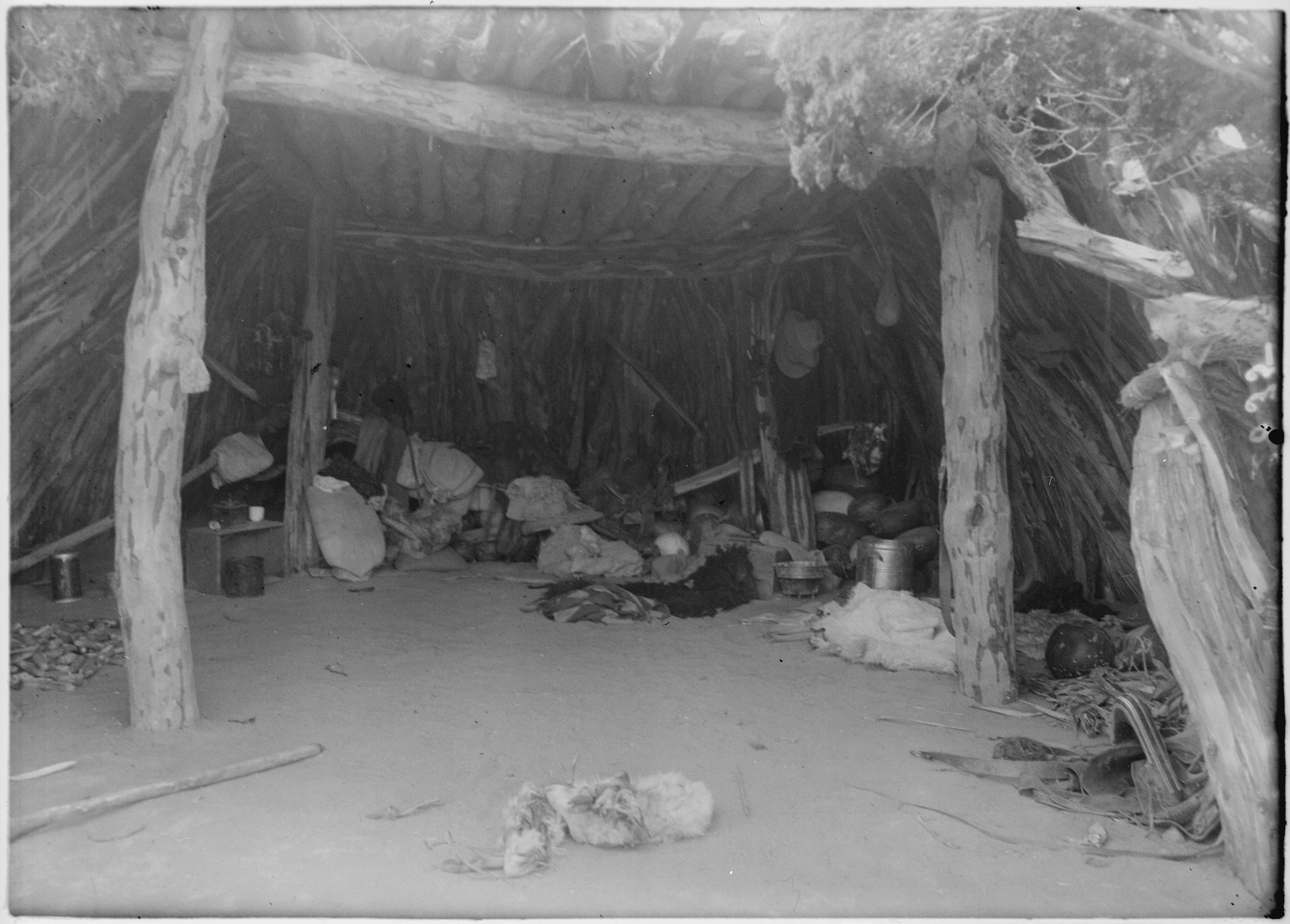
- interior of a Kickapoo wickiup in Indian Territory, 1880

Total population
- 2,630

Regions with significant populations
- United States (Oklahoma)

Languages
- Kickapoo, English

Religion
- traditional tribal religion, Native American Church, Christianity (Protestant)

Related ethnic groups
- Sac and Fox Nation and other Algonquian peoples

The Kickapoo Tribe of Oklahoma is one of three federally recognized Kickapoo tribes in the United States. There are also Kickapoo tribes in Kansas, Texas, and Mexico. The Kickapoo are a Woodland tribe, who speak an Algonquian language. They are affiliated with the Kickapoo Traditional Tribe of Texas, the Kickapoo Tribe in Kansas, and the Mexican Kickapoo.

== Government ==
Map of Kickapoo Tribe of Oklahoma's tribal jurisdictional area (OTSA) and nearby jurisdiction areas.

The Kickapoo Tribe of Oklahoma is headquartered in McLoud, Oklahoma, and their tribal jurisdictional area is in Oklahoma, Pottawatomie, and Lincoln Counties.

Of the 2,630 enrolled tribal citizens, 1,856 live within the state of Oklahoma. Enrollment in the tribe requires a minimum blood quantum of 1/4 Kickapoo descent.

As of 2025, the current administration is:

- Chairman: Darwin Kaskaske
- Vice Chairman: Marlon Frye
- Secretary: Patricia Gonzales
- Treasurer: Vacant
- Councilperson: Evel Green

The tribe operates its own housing authority and issues tribal vehicle tags.

== Economic development ==
The Kickapoo Tribe of Oklahoma owns a gas station, and 2 casinos. Their estimated annual economic impact was $16 million in 2010. Kickapoo Casino is located north of McLoud, Oklahoma, near the Tribal Headquarters.

== Language ==
In 2009, about 400 tribal cizitens spoke the Kickapoo language. It is one of the few Oklahoma tribal languages spoken by children today.

== History ==
=== Northern origins ===
Kickapoo comes from their word "Kiwigapawa", which roughly translates into "he moves from here to there." The tribe is part of the central Algonquian group and has close ethnic and linguistic connections with the Sac and Fox. The Kickapoo were first recorded in history in about 1667-70 at the confluence of the Fox and Wisconsin Rivers. Under pressure from the Menominee, the Kickapoo and their allies moved south and west into southern Michigan, northern Iowa, Ohio and Illinois. A treaty dated 7 June 1803 between the U.S. Government and the Delaware, Shawnee, Potawatomi, Miami, Eel River, Wea, Kickapoo, Piankeshaw, and Kaskaskia tribes occupying the country watered by the Ohio, Wabash and Miami Rivers and a subsequent treaty dated 7 August 1803 ceded lands previously granted in the Treaty of Greenville in 1795 by General Anthony Wayne, and Fort Wayne and Vincennes, Indiana. By these treaties and succeeding treaties in 1809, 1815, 1816, 1819, and 1820 the tribe ceded all their lands on the Wabash, White and Vermilion Rivers and moved into Missouri on the Osage River.

=== Resettlement on the Plains ===
A mere decade later, in 1832, the tribe ceded their lands in Missouri and were granted a "permanent" home south of the Delaware Nation in Kansas near Fort Leavenworth. Around the same time as the Kickapoo moved into Kansas, some of them went to Texas, invited to settle there by the Spanish colonial governor to serve as a buffer between Mexico and American expansionists. The Mexican War of Independence and the Texas Revolution proved that the tide of settlers would not be stopped by the few hundred Kickapoo. At the conclusion of the Texas Revolution, these groups moved south into Mexico. In 1854 the eastern portion of the Kansas lands was ceded to the United States leaving the Kickapoo the western 150,000 acres. Two provisions of this treaty were to have long-lasting effects on the tribe. The treaty authorized a survey of the Kickapoo lands which could be used as the basis for fee simple allotment and it granted a railroad right-of-way across the reservation.

Using these two clauses as a basis, the local agent, William Badger, convinced the Commissioner of Indian Affairs Charles E. Mix that the Kickapoo were desirous of having their lands allotted. Considering that the tribe had always held their lands in common, it is unlikely that the tribe truly wanted allotment. However, in light of Badger's persuasion, Mix directed that allotment proceed if 1) the Indians paid for the costs of surveying and allotting the land, 2) 80 acres was allotted to each head of household, and 3) any lands remaining after allotment of the Kansas Kickapoo be reserved for resettlement of the Mexican Kickapoo. Holding the lands not allotted for the Southern Kickapoo, was not in the interests of the railroad and Badger began pressuring tribal citizens for allotment. Though they complained, it was a political election, not the tribal issues with their agent, that removed Badger from office and replaced him with his brother-in-law Charles B. Keith in 1861.

Keith was a political ally of Senator Samuel C. Pomeroy who was the president of the Atchison and Pike's Peak Railroad, the central section of the Transcontinental railroad, which had been formed in 1859. The railroad wanted to gain the right-of-way across the Kickapoo Reservation and title to any surplus lands when the reservation was allotted. Pomeroy and Keith both met with and wrote letters to Commissioner Mix urging allotment and by 1862, a treaty was again made with the Kickapoo. The 28 June 1862 agreement allowed for Chiefs to receive 320 acres, heads of households to receive 160 acres and all other tribe citizens to get 40 acres, with the bulk of the remaining 125,000 acres to be sold to the railroad. Those who chose not to accept allotment could continue to hold their lands in common until such time as an arrangement could be made to locate a new reserve in Oklahoma, i.e. Indian Territory, and any Southern Kickapoo had one year to return to Kansas and take up their allotment, or it would be forfeit. When news of the treaty being approved broke, protest erupted.

The Kickapoo indicated that they were unaware that the agreement had been reached and thought that they were still negotiating terms. The Kansas Attorney General, Warren William Guthrie, launched a grand jury hearing. The charges were considered serious enough that allotment was suspended and the new Commissioner of Indian Affairs, William P. Dole, appointed in 1863, traveled to Kansas to investigate. In the hearings that followed, allegations were made that Guthrie's real interest in the matter stemmed from his involvement with a rival railroad the Hannibal and St. Joseph Railroad Corporation. Dole returned to Washington and submitted his report to President Lincoln on 4 April 1864. Some of the frustrated Kickapoo, decided to leave Kansas, and a group of about 700 headed for Mexico to join kinsmen there in September, 1864. In 1865 pressure from Pomeroy finally gained the approval to continue with the Kickapoo allotment, though the tribe resisted. By 1869, only 93 Kansas Kickapoo had accepted fee simple allotment, the remainder preferring to continue holding their lands in common. Though a small band, approximately 50 tribesmen returned from Mexico to the Kansas Reservation before the forfeit period lapsed, they settled on the common lands briefly, but then left before claiming their allotments. They later joined the Kickapoo in Indian Territory in 1874. In 1875, a group of 114 of the Mexican Kickapoos were returned to the Kansas Reservation.

=== Texas Settlement ===
The first Southern Kickapoo migration occurred around the time that the tribe was settled in Kansas. They traveled across the southern plains, fighting the Seminole in Florida around 1837 and wandered into Texas in search of horses from the Comanche. In 1850, they agreed to act as a buffer between Mexicans, invading Texas settlers and the Lipan, Comanche and other tribes in Northern Coahuila. As a reward for their service, the Spanish governor awarded them a land grant at Hacienda del Nacimiento near the settlement of Santa Rosa (now known as Melchor Múzquiz). At the peak of their strength, the southern Kickapoo, numbered about 1500 and by 1860 were living in a swath from the Canadian and Washita Rivers in Indian Territory to the Sabine and Brazos Rivers in Texas to the Remolino River in northern Mexico.

In 1864, about 700 Kickapoo, frustrated with the duplicitous actions of agents and their railroad colleagues in Kansas left to join their kinsmen in Mexico. Confederate scouts picked up their trail and reported their findings to Captain Henry Fossett and Captain S. S. Totten, leader of a group of Texas Militiamen. On 8 January 1865, the Texans charged the Kickapoo at Dove Creek, were engaged in battle for a brief half hour and then retreated. The Kickapoo had lost about 15 warriors and the Texans twice as many men. In 1868, a report to the Commissioner of Indian Affairs indicated that there were approximately 800 Kickapoo living in Mexico and claimed that the Mexican Kickapoo were responsible for raids in the western part of Texas. In an effort to pacify the Texas citizens and ward off difficulties with Mexico, the U.S. determined to retrieve the Kickapoo.

Congress passed P.L. 16 Stat. 359 an Act of 15 July 1870 to appropriate funds for the Secretary of the Interior to collect Kickapoo in Texas and Mexico and establish them in the Indian Territory. A second Act, P.L. 16 Stat. 569, passed by Congress on 3 March 1871 appropriated funds for the resettlement and subsistence of the Kickapoo on reservations within the United States. Armed with these two Acts, Indian Agent John D. Miles, went with a delegation of Kansas Kickapoo to try to persuade the Indians at Santa Rosa to return to the United States. Mexican authorities refused to allow Miles to speak with the Kickapoo as the residents of Santa Rosa saw them as their only defense from other marauding tribes.

In 1873, after complaints were again received indicating that Mexican authorities were using the Kickapoo to hide the theft of Texas cattle by Mexicans, another attempt was made to bring the Kickapoo to Indian Territory. Special Agents H. M. Atkinson and Col. T. G. Williams went to Saltillo, to negotiate directly with Governor Victoriano Cepeda Camacho. Though citizens and the Legislature of Coahuila did not support the action, Cepeda appointed an officer to assist the agents and gave him a proclamation that they were to be assisted by the officials and citizenry. While the delegation was en route to Santa Rosa, a party of Americans under the command of General MacKenzie attacked the Kickapoo, thinking that they were a group of raiding Lipan, which did not make the Kickapoo receptive to relocating when the agents arrived. In the autumn of 1874, Atkinson and Williams were finally able to persuade a group of about 300 Mexican Kickapoo to resettle.

=== Relocation to Oklahoma ===
The Mexican Kickapoos were to be removed to the Indian Territory, in the present State of Oklahoma to a location on the north fork of the Canadian River and provided with farm equipment to begin cultivation. The adjustment was difficult and by 1883, they had still not been provided with a permanent title to the lands they were occupying. By an executive order issued 15 August 1883, the Kickapoo were granted the lands that they had been occupying near the southwest corner of the Sac and Fox Reservation which had been ceded in 1866 by the Muscogee (Creek) Nation for resettlement of freedmen and others. Four years later with the passage of the Dawes Act pressure began mounting to secure fee simple title for the Oklahoma Kickapoo. On 21 June 1891 the tribe agreed to cede their reservation in exchange for 80 acre allotments for each tribesman. The Kickapoo were "bitterly opposed" to allotment and fought the process until 1894. 283 Kickapoo received eighty-acre plots leaving 184,133 surplus acres for non-Indian settlement.

In 1895, after the Kickapoo finally consented to allotment, the final Oklahoma Land Run occurred on 23 May 1895. The Land Run of 1895 was the smallest of Oklahoma's five land runs, with approximately 10,000 participants. Because of the large number of contested claims and the problems with Sooners, the remaining two land openings in Oklahoma were lotteries.

== 20th century ==
=== Indian Reorganization Act ===
In 1936, the tribe organized as the Kickapoo Tribe of Oklahoma, under the Oklahoma Indian Welfare Act. They adopted a Constitution and by-laws by a vote of 64 for and 26 against on 18 September 1937, which established the offices of Chairman, Vice Chairman, Secretary, Treasurer, and one councilman.

=== Claims Commission ===
On 13 August 1946 the Indian Claims Commission Act of 1946, Pub. L. No. 79-726, ch. 959, passed. Its purpose was to settle for all time any outstanding grievances or claims the tribes might have against the U.S. for treaty breaches, unauthorized taking of land, dishonorable or unfair dealings, or inadequate compensation. Claims had to be filed within a five-year period, and most of the 370 complaints that were submitted were filed at the approach of the 5-year deadline in August, 1951.

At least 6 claims were filed by the Kickapoo Tribe of Oklahoma with the Claims Commission — some on their own behalf, and some in conjunction with the Kickapoo Tribe of Kansas or other tribes in which they had made joint treaties with the U. S. Government. The two biggest awards were for "unconscionable consideration" (the government severely underpaid for ceded lands) from the Treaty of 1854 and the Treaty of 1866. Though the distribution was approved via passage of Public Law 92-467 in 1972, appeals were pending into the late 1970s, as the government was offsetting award amounts due to the Oklahoma and Kansas Kickapoo for expenses incurred in capturing and relocating Mexican Kickapoo during the Texas Revolution. The US government had repatriated some of the Mexican Kickapoos to a reservation in Oklahoma and a later group to Kansas in the 1860s and 1870s. The final distribution plan was not approved until 1980.

=== Mexican Kickapoo subgroup established ===
In 1979 the Mexican Kickapoo who were dual residents requested clarification of their status as they had no clear legal status in either the United States or Mexico. An Act was passed in 1983 by Congress which recognized them as a distinct subgroup of the Kickapoo Tribe of Oklahoma and granted federal recognition to the Texas Kickapoo. A 1985 law gave the Texas band the option of selecting Mexican or U.S. citizenship. 145 of the tribal citizens chose to become U.S. citizens, and the approximately remaining 500 ones chose to obtain Mexican citizenship.

The interaction between the Mexican Kickapoo and Oklahoma tribe remains strong. Mexican Kickapoos use the health services of the tribal clinic in McLoud, Oklahoma and the Oklahoma Kickapoos travel for the ceremonial seasons in February and March to Mexico.

== Education ==
The Kickapoo Tribe of Kansas tribal school is the Kickapoo Nation School.

The Kickapoo Tribe of Oklahoma maintains the Kickapoo Community Day Care facility and the Kickapoo Nation Head Start Program to serve both enrolled citizens and non-citizens residing within the boundaries of the original Kickapoo Tribe Reservation lands.

== Notable tribal citizens ==
- Arigon Starr, musician, comic artist
- Gregorio E. Kishketon, Native American/Alaskan Native Liaison to the Secretary of the Veterans Affairs in Washington, District of Columbia.
