= Kickapoo Nation School =

American tribal school

Coordinates: 39.7589°N 95.6355°W

Location
- 400 1st Street; Powhattan, Brown County, Kansas 66527; United States

Information
- NCES School ID: 590010300102
- Website: kickapoonationschool.org

Kickapoo Nation School is a K-12 tribal school in Powhattan, Kansas, United States. It is affiliated with the Bureau of Indian Affairs (BIE). It is the sole tribal school in the state. The school is 6 miles (9.7 km) north of the Kickapoo Indian Reservation. The school serves, in addition to Kickapoo people, the Potawotami tribe and the Sac and Fox tribe.

== History ==
In 1981 it moved into its current facility, which was formerly used by another school.

In 2004 Brent Wasko of the St. Joseph News-Press reported that area residents did not positively perceive the school, and that the school community was working to fight that perception.

== Operations ==
The Kansas Department of Education considers Kickapoo School a "nonpublic" school. The National Center for Education Statistics (NCES) counts it as a public school.

As of 2006 it admits students not registered in Native American tribes but charges them tuition for them as the BIE only gives money for enrolled members of tribes; a non-tribal family price as of that year was $200 per semester or $100 for one student.

== Curriculum ==
It has a bilingual English-Kickapoo language program, the only such program in Kansas for an indigenous American language. The school made efforts to preserve the language.

According to the Topeka Capital-Journal, by 2006 there was positive attention on the school's BIE-funded Family and Child Education (FACE) program which has home-based education for both parents and children.

As of 2006 the school did not have funds to have laptops for their students compared to public schools that received more funding. However beginning in fall 2006 it planned to establish a virtual learning program to make up for subject matters in which it lacks on-site teachers.

== Student body ==
In 2004 it had 91 students, all of them being Native American. In 2016 it had 58 students. Many students come from the Kickapoo reservation and a number reside in Topeka.

== Staff ==
In 2016 it had eight teachers.

== Athletics ==
As of 2006 because of relatively low enrollment numbers, athletic programs often struggled to find enough students. In 2004 the track team had seven members. By 2016 it was making an attempt to form a track team but it had no athletic teams at all at the moment.
