= Kickapoo =

Native American tribe based in the United States and Mexico

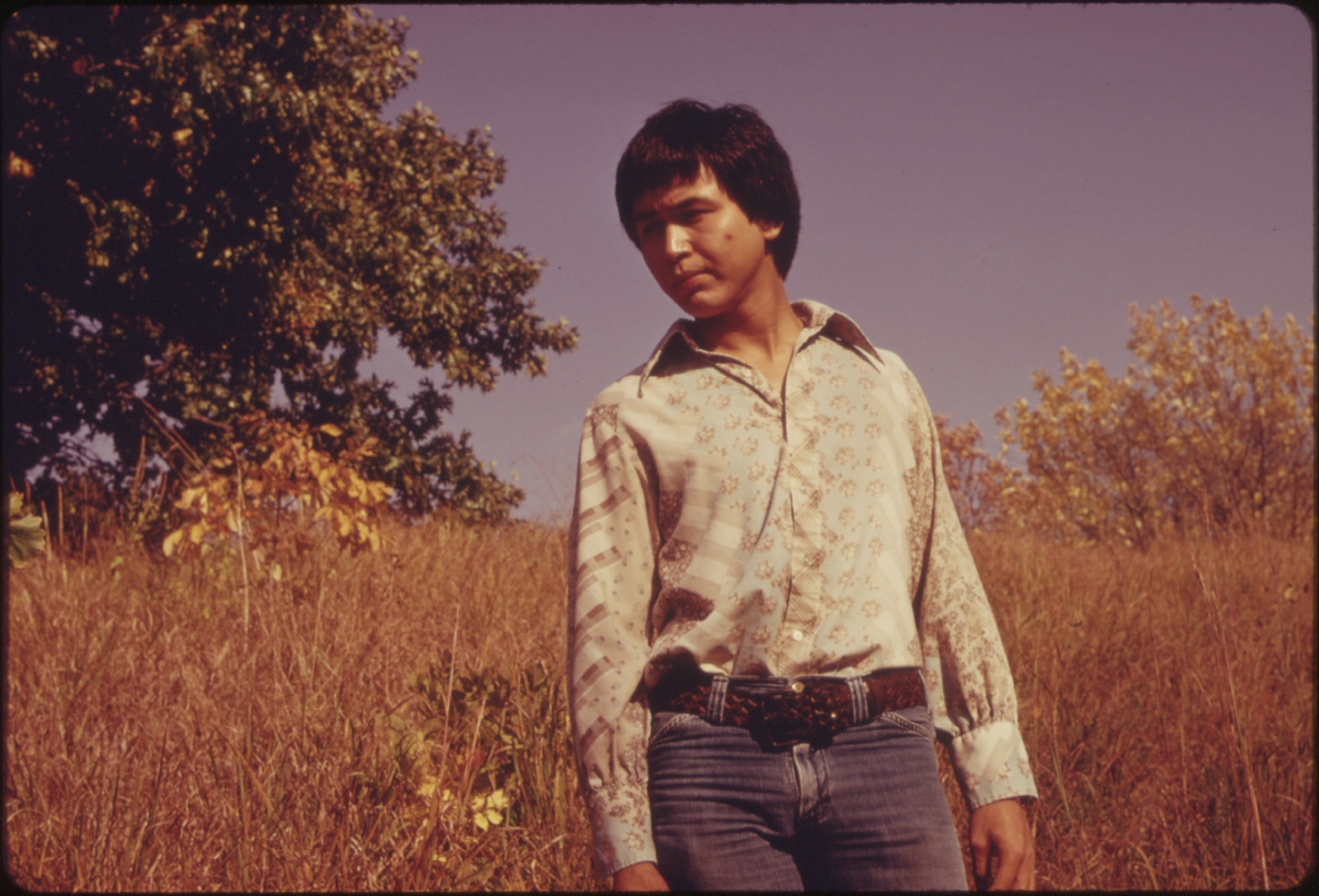
- Ron McKinney (Mahuk), Kickapoo-Potawatomi, Documerica project photo, Doniphan County, Kansas, 1974

Total population
- 5,000 self-identified (3,000 enrolled citizens)

Regions with significant populations
- United States (Kansas, Oklahoma, Texas); Mexico (Coahuila, Sonora, Durango)

Languages
- English, Spanish, Kickapoo

Religion
- Native American Church; Christianity (many Catholic, some Protestant); tribal religious practices

Related ethnic groups
- Sauk, Meskwaki, other Algonquian peoples

The Kickapoo people (/ˈkɪkəˌpuː/) are an Algonquian-speaking Indigenous people of the Northeastern Woodlands. They originated in the Great Lakes region, and today are Native American tribes and an Indigenous people in Mexico, who primarily live in Kansas, Oklahoma, Texas, and Coahuila.

There are three federally recognized Kickapoo tribes in the United States: the Kickapoo Tribe in Kansas, the Kickapoo Tribe of Oklahoma, and the Kickapoo Traditional Tribe of Texas. The Kickapoo in Kansas were relocated after exchanging their reservation lands in southern Missouri in 1832 as a land exchange. Around 3,000 Kickapoo people are enrolled tribal citizens.

Another band, the Mexican Kickapoo, live in the Múzquiz Municipality in the northern Mexican state of Coahuila. They moved there after a schism between followers of the Prophet Kennekuk and Chief Kishko, leader of the Prairie Band. Smaller bands live in Sonora, to the west, and Durango, to the southwest.

== Name ==
The name Kickapoo is also written Kiikaapoa or Kiikaapoi. In Spanish, it is written Kikapú. The name comes from Kiwigapawa, a Kickapoo language word for "he move about, standing now here, now there".

== Language ==
The Kickapoo speak the Kickapoo language, which is an Algonquian-language.

== History ==
=== 17th and 18th centuries ===
The Kickapoo are closely tied to the Sauk and Meskwaki peoples. Their first recorded contact with Europeans took place in 1667 in Southern Wisconsin when they met Catholic missionaries.

The Kickapoo encountered the La Salle Expeditions into Illinois Country in 1682. The French colonists set up remote fur trading posts throughout the region, including on the Wabash River. They typically set up posts at or near Native American villages. Terre Haute was founded as an associated French village. The Kickapoo had to contend with a changing cast of Europeans; the British defeated the French in the Seven Years' War and took over nominal rule of former French territory east of the Mississippi River after 1763. They increased their own trading with the Kickapoo.

The Kickapoo were part of the Wabash Confederacy, which included the Piankeshaw and the Wea to their north, and the powerful Miami Tribe, to their east. A subgroup lived in the Upper Iowa River region in what was later known as northeast Iowa and the Root River region in southeast Minnesota in the late 17th century and early 18th century. This group was probably known by the clan name "Mahouea", derived from the Illinoian word for wolf, m'hwea.

Following the French and Indian War, the Kickapoo moved into present-day southern Illinois.

In 1795, they signed the Treaty of Greenville along with neighboring tribes and the United States.

=== 19th century ===
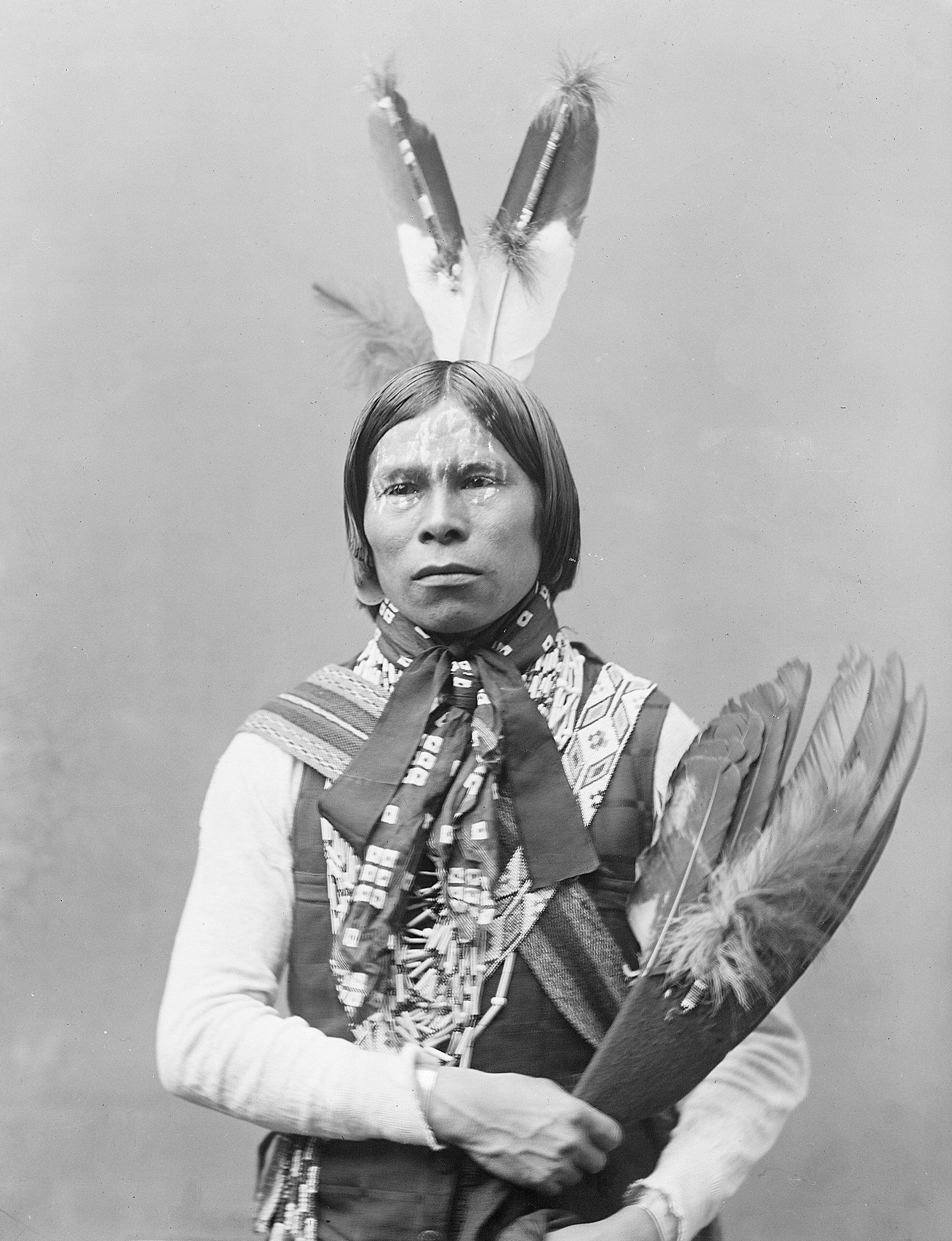
Babe Shkit, Kickapoo chief and delegate from Indian Territory, c. 1900

The United States acquired the territory east of the Mississippi River and north of the Ohio River after it gained independence from Great Britain (now the United Kingdom). As white settlers moved into the region from the United States' eastern areas, beginning in the early 19th century, the Kickapoo were under pressure. They negotiated with the United States over their territory in several treaties, including the Treaty of Vincennes, the Treaty of Grouseland, and the Treaty of Fort Wayne. They sold most of their lands to the United States and moved north to settle among the Wea people.

Rising tensions between the regional tribes and the United States led to Tecumseh's War in 1811. The Kickapoo were among the closest allies of Shawnee leader Tecumseh. Many Kickapoo warriors participated in the Battle of Tippecanoe and the subsequent War of 1812 on the side of the British, hoping to expel the white American settlers from the region.

The 1819 treaty of Edwardsville saw the Kickapoo cede the entirety of their holdings in Illinois comprising nearly one-half area of the state, in exchange for a smaller tract on the Osage river in Missouri and $3,000 worth of goods. The Kickapoo were not eager to move, partly as their assigned tract in Missouri was made of rugged hills and already occupied by the Osage, who were their hereditary enemies. Instead, half of the population traveled south and crossed onto the Spanish side of the Red River in modern-day Texas. The US government quickly mobilized to prevent this emigration and force their removal to Missouri. This remnant of Kickapoo remained in Illinois under the guidance of Kennekuk, a prominent, nonviolent spiritual leader among the Kickapoo. He led his followers during the Indian Removal in the 1830s to their current tribal lands in Kansas. He died there of smallpox in 1852.

The close of the war led to a change of federal Indian policy in the Indiana Territory, and later the state of Indiana. White American leaders began to advocate the removal of tribes to lands west of the Mississippi River, to remove their claims to Native lands wanted by white American settlers. The Kickapoo were among the first tribes to leave Indiana under this program. They accepted land in Kansas and an annual subsidy in exchange for leaving their land in the state.

== Tribes and communities ==
Three federally recognized Kickapoo communities are in the United States in Kansas, Texas, and Oklahoma. The Mexican Kickapoo are closely tied to the Texas and Oklahoma communities. These groups migrate annually among the three locations to maintain connections. Indeed, the Texas and Mexican branches are the same cross-border nation, called the Kickapoo of Coahuila/Texas.

=== Kickapoo Indian Reservation of Kansas ===
The tribe in Kansas was home to the prophet Kenekuk, known for his astute leadership, which allowed the small group to maintain their reservation. Kenekuk aimed to preserve order among his tribe while living in Kansas. He also focused on keeping the identity of the Kickapoo people intact, especially given all the relocations they had experienced.

The basis of Kenekuk's leadership began in the religious revivals of the 1820s and 1830s, with a blend of Protestantism and Catholicism. Kenekuk taught his tribesmen and white audiences to obey God's commands, for sinners were damned to the pits of hell. Once the Kickapoo people were relocated to Kansas, they resisted Protestant and Catholic theology and started focusing more on farming, so they could provide food for the rest of the tribe. After this had happened, they remained together and claimed some of the original land that they had before it was taken by Americans.

The Kickapoo Indian Reservation of Kansas is located at 39°40′51″N 95°36′41″W in the northeastern part of the state in parts of three counties: Brown, Jackson, and Atchison. It has a land area of 612.203 square kilometres (236.373 sq mi) and a resident population of 4,419 as of the 2000 census. The largest community on the reservation is the city of Horton. The other communities are:

- Muscotah
- Netawaka
- Powhattan
- Whiting
- Willis

=== Kickapoo Indian Reservation of Texas ===
The Kickapoo Indian Reservation of Texas is located at 28°36′37″N 100°26′19″W on the Rio Grande on the U.S.-Mexico border in western Maverick County, just south of the city of Eagle Pass Texas, as part of the community of Rosita South. It has a land area of 0.4799 square kilometres (118.6 acres) and a 2000 census population of 420 persons. The Texas Indian Commission officially recognized the tribe in 1977.

Other Kickapoo in Maverick County, Texas, constitute the "South Texas Subgroup of the Kickapoo Tribe of Oklahoma". That tribe formerly owned 917.79 acres (3.7142 km^{2}) of non-reservation land in Maverick County, primarily to the north of Eagle Pass, but has sold most of it to a developer. It has an office in that city.

=== Kickapoo Tribe of Oklahoma ===
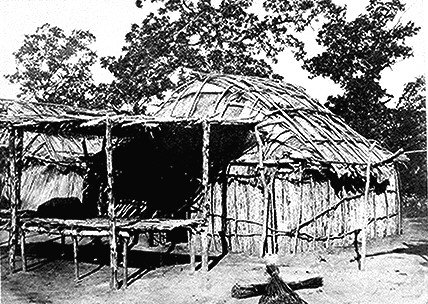
A Kickapoo wickiup, Sac and Fox Agency, Oklahoma, c. 1880

After being expelled from the Republic of Texas, many Kickapoo moved south to Mexico, but the population of two villages settled in Indian Territory. One village settled within the Chickasaw Nation and the other within the Muscogee Creek Nation. These Kickapoo were granted their own reservation in 1883 and became recognized as the Kickapoo Tribe of Oklahoma.

The reservation was short-lived. In 1893 under the Dawes Act, their communal tribal lands were broken up and assigned to separate member households by allotments. The tribe's government was dismantled by the Curtis Act of 1898, part of a larger federal policy forcing Native Americans to assimilate into European-American culture. Tribal citizens struggled under these conditions.

In the 1930s, the federal government allowed tribes to reorganize their governments. The Kickapoo Tribe of Oklahoma organized in 1936, under the Oklahoma Indian Welfare Act.

Today the Kickapoo Tribe of Oklahoma is headquartered in McLoud, Oklahoma. Their tribal jurisdictional area is in Oklahoma, Pottawatomie, and Lincoln counties. They have 2,719 enrolled tribal citizens.

== See also ==
- Kickapoo whistled speech
- Mascouten

== See also ==
- Kickapoo Joy Juice
