= Folk healer =

Unlicensed traditional health practitioner

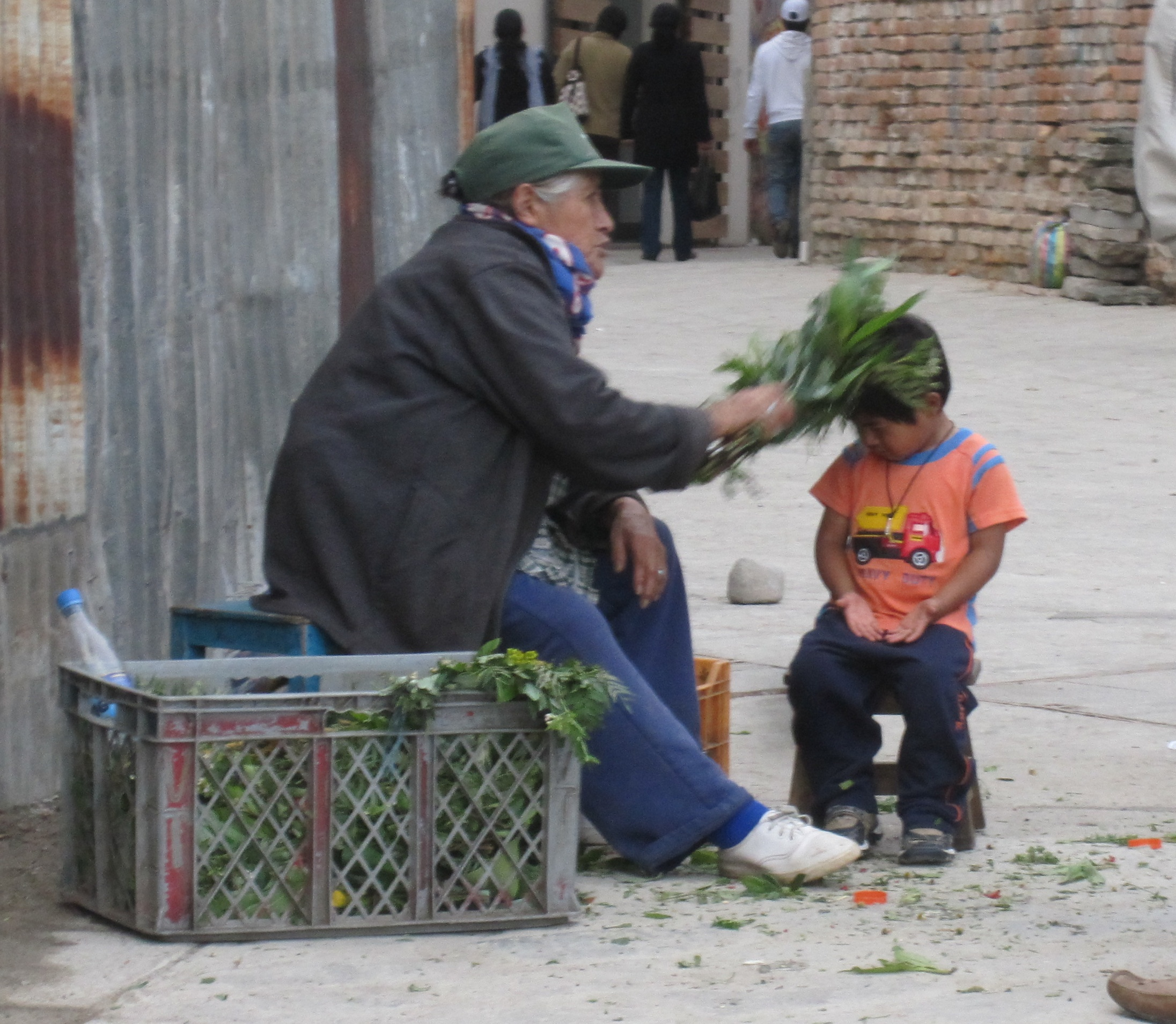
Curandera performing a limpieza (lit. 'cleaning') in Cuenca, Ecuador

A Lampucchwa Tharu folk healer from Nepal describing the benefits of local plants in Saptariya Tharu

A folk healer is an unlicensed person who practices the art of healing using traditional practices, herbal remedies and the power of suggestion.

== Origin ==
The term "folk" was traditionally associated with medical and healing practices that weren't explicitly approved by the dominant religious institution. People who didn't seek help from an approved priest or religious figure would seek the help of the local folk healer. Folk healers were often viewed as being more involved with the healing process and made their patients more comfortable than other practitioners. They play vital roles in many communities by providing accessible care that integrates cultural, religious, and social beliefs.

== Region-specific names and practices ==
Although common across the globe, each region has its own unique cultural practices and names for their folk healers.

=== US Appalachian Mountain region ===
Before colonization by white Europeans, native medicine men and women practiced healing throughout Appalachia and the greater United States.

Colonizers later brought their own folk healing practices and adapted them to use native plants found on the land. Granny women are purported to be healers and midwives in Southern Appalachia and the Ozarks, claimed by a few academics as practicing from the 1880s to the 1930s. They are theorized to be usually elder women in the community and may have been the only practitioners of health care in the poor rural areas of Appalachia. They are often thought not to have expected or received payment and were respected as authorities on herbal healing and childbirth. They are mentioned by John C. Campbell in The Southern Highlander and His Homeland:

There is something magnificent in many of the older women with their stern theology – part mysticism, part fatalism – and their deep understanding of life. ..."Granny" – and one may be a grandmother young in the mountains – if she has survived the labor and tribulation of her younger days, has gained freedom and a place of irresponsible authority in the home hardly rivaled by the men of the family. ...Though superstitious she has a fund of common sense, and she is a shrewd judge of character. In sickness, she is the first to be consulted, for she is generally something of an herb doctor, and her advice is sought by the young people of half the countryside in all things from a love affair to putting a new web in the loom.

The Foxfire books, consisting of 12 original books, is a collection of written entries that have been comprised to preserve Appalachian culture. Inside these books, readers can find a variety of recipes, how-tos, and descriptions of what it was like to live in rural Appalachia before technology was widely adopted. These books have been viewed as a source of the very intimate daily life of rural Appalachians throughout history and are believed to perpetuate the values and belief systems of the people of the time, and, arguably, of the region today.

Foxfire volume 11 specifically elaborates on common herbal remedies and healing procedures of historic Appalachia, all of which had been created and passed down through families and folk healers. Book 11 also details tasks such as how to grow a successful garden, beekeeping, and the effective and proper ways to preserve food.

Folk medicine in Appalachia has historically included non-traditional methods of treating skin cancer. In the early 1900s, for example, a Virginia man named Thomas Raleigh Carter became renowned for his prowess in healing skin cancer in addition to his midwifery. Although he was a minister, his treatments focused on the application or ingestion of specific herbs and plants rather than on faith in a higher power. Carter kept his formula secret, even from his immediate family, and treated many people for lesions and skin conditions believed to be cancerous.

== Gendered profession ==
Historically, women have taken on roles of communal folk healers. While some men learned the practices associated with healing, women tended to dominate the field because of their association with child care and at-home remedies. Women were assigned the responsibility of caring for sick loved ones because of their historic restriction to other professions and tasks in society. Particularly in African-American communities, due to their extended marginalization from society, it was not unfamiliar to have a designated female healer in the community to provide healing and medicinal treatment because of their exclusion from white medical practices and institutions.

Women throughout history were typically the ones who were concerned with the physical demands of pregnancy and childbirth. A large majority of the earliest forms of folk healing focused on a woman's body during these life stages. Because of this, folk healers have come to be associated with women's fertility, something the religious institutions at the time grew dissatisfied with. The men who dominated these religious spaces wanted to have the main control over fertility as a way to exert their power. However, folk healers did not stop their work with pregnancy and childbirth and often became very well-versed in the needs and potential complications that could come from childbirth in early history. Since folk healers refused to abandon this area of medicine, they were recognized as a negative force by religious institutions. This is why folk healers were often viewed as witches and became connected to the earliest forms of abortion care.

== See also ==
- Alternative medicine
- Cunning folk
- Curandero
- Faith healing
- Folk medicine
- Home remedy
- Kitchen witch
- Medicine man (Native American)
- Traditional healers of Southern Africa
- White witch
- Witch doctor
- Witcher (mythology)

== Sources ==
- Keith Thomas, Religion and the Decline of Magic (1971), p. 534.
- Ryan Stark, Rhetoric, Science, and Magic in Seventeenth-Century England (2009), 123-27.
- Anthony P. Cavender. Folk Medicine in Southern Appalachia (2003).
