= Palaú =

- Town
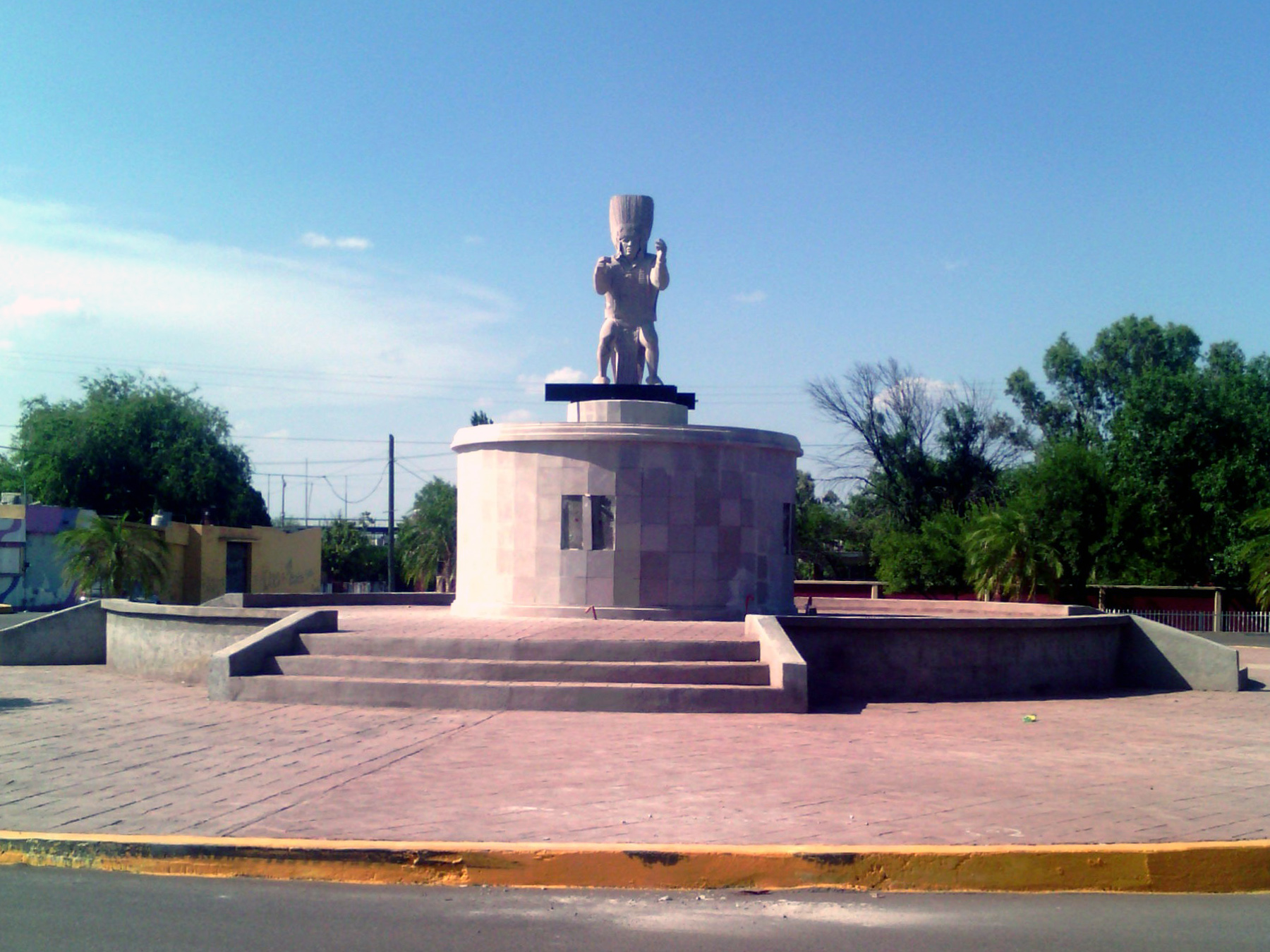
- Monument to Matlachin

- Location in Mexico Palaú (Mexico)
- Coordinates: 27°55′0″N 101°25′0″W
- Country: Mexico
- State: Coahuila
- Municipality: Múzquiz
- Elevation: 440 m (1,440 ft)

Population (2020)
  - Total: 17,594

Palaú is a town in the Mexican state of Coahuila. It is located on the eastern boundary of the Chihuahuan Desert, in the municipality of Múzquiz. Temperatures in the summertime can easily reach 45 degrees Celsius and the winters are mild but wet. The main industry is coal mining.

When an Austrian engineer discovered these energy riches in the late 19th century, the northern portion of Coahuila quickly transformed from a sparsely populated region of cattle ranchers to an industrial powerhouse. Thousands of Japanese immigrants came seeking work; some of their descendants, with Japanese surnames, are still here. Simabuco is one of several Japanese Surnames and is traced back to Anastacio Simabuco one of the earliest settlers of Palau he is believed to have migrated from Okinawa, Japan at the turn of the 20th century.

Coahuila coal feeds steel mills in Monclova and Monterrey, the country's third-largest city. Two coal-fired electric plants near the U.S. border supply as much as 8 percent of Mexico's electricity.

Population (INEGI 2005): 16,133 (men 8,063; women 8,070)
