= Medicine man (Native American) =

Native American traditional healer and spiritual practitioner

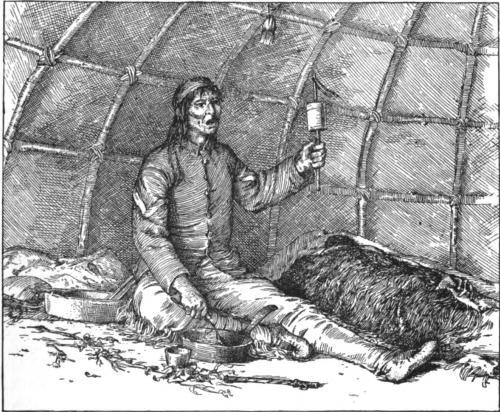
An Ojibwe midew 'ceremonial leader' in a mide-wiigiwaam 'medicine lodge'

A medicine man or medicine woman is a traditional healer and spiritual leader who serves a community of Indigenous people of the Americas. Each culture has its own name in its language for spiritual healers and ceremonial leaders.

== Cultural context ==
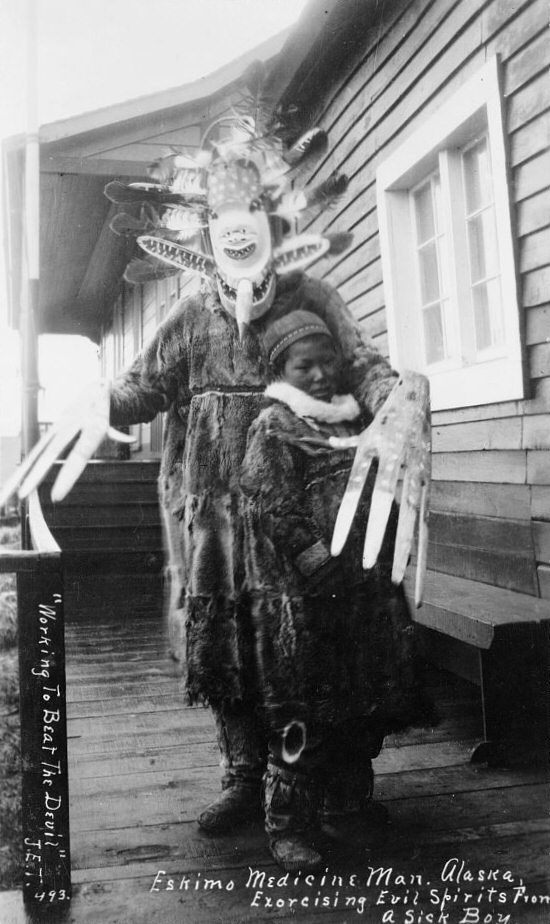
Yup'ik "medicine man exorcising evil spirits from a sick boy" in Nushagak, Alaska, 1890s

In the ceremonial context of Indigenous North American communities, "medicine" usually refers to spiritual healing. Medicine people use many practices, including specialized knowledge of Native American ethnobotany. Herbal healing is a common practice in many Indigenous households of the Americas; however, medicine people often have more in-depth knowledge of using plants for healing or other purposes.

The terms medicine people or ceremonial people are sometimes used in Native American and First Nations communities, for example, when Arwen Nuttall (Cherokee) of the National Museum of the American Indian writes, "The knowledge possessed by medicine people is privileged, and it often remains in particular families."

Native Americans tend to be quite reluctant to discuss issues about medicine or medicine people with non-Indians. In some cultures, the people will not even discuss these matters with American Indians from other tribes. In most tribes, medicine elders are prohibited from advertising or introducing themselves as such. As Nuttall writes, "An inquiry to a Native person about religious beliefs or ceremonies is often viewed with suspicion." One example of this is the Apache medicine cord or Izze-kloth whose purpose and use by Apache medicine elders was a mystery to nineteenth century ethnologists because "the Apache look upon these cords as so sacred that strangers are not allowed to see them, much less handle them or talk about them."

The term medicine man/woman, like the term shaman, has been criticized by Native Americans, as well as other specialists in the fields of religion and anthropology.

While non-Native anthropologists often use the term shaman for Indigenous healers worldwide, including the Americas, shaman is the specific name for a spiritual mediator from the Tungusic peoples of Siberia, which has been adopted by some Inuit communities but is not preferred by Native American or First Nations communities.

== See also ==
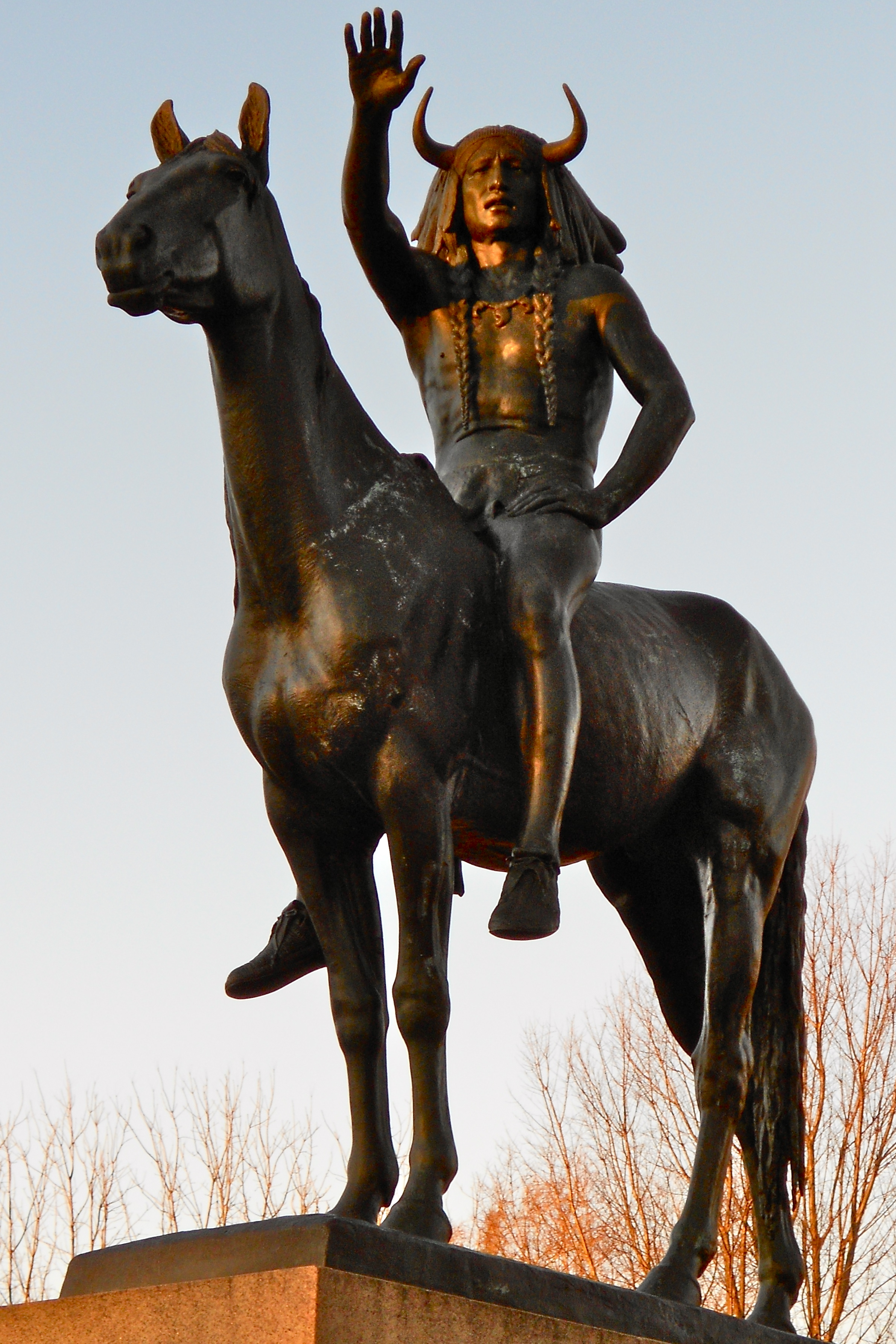
The Medicine Man, an 1899 sculpture by Cyrus Dallin exhibited in Philadelphia

- Bomoh – Malay shaman and traditional medicine practitioner
- Cleverman – Australian Aboriginal spiritual healers
- Cultural appropriation – Adoption of culture and cultural identity perceived as inappropriate
- Curandero – Traditional healer in Latin America and the United States
- Dukun – Indonesian term for shaman
- Folk healer – Unlicensed traditional health practitioner
- Herbalism – Study and use of medicinal properties of plants
- Holism – Philosophical theory
- Keewaydinoquay Peschel – American herbalist and author from Michigan, U.S. (1919–1999)
- Kallawaya – Indigenous group in the Andes
- Kennekuk
- Medicine bag – Traditional North American Indian pouch
- Native American ethnobotany – List of plants used by indigenous peoples of North America
- Native American religion – Systems of faith and worship of the Native Americans
- Plastic shaman – Fraudulent spiritual practitioner
- Prehistoric medicine – Medicine in the time before the invention of writing
- Quesalid
- Shamanism – Religious practice
- Trance – Abnormal state of wakefulness or altered state of consciousness
- Witch doctor
