= Sauk =

Sauk may refer to:

== People ==
- Jacek Sauk (born 1944), Polish politician
- Matthew Sauk (born 1976), American football player
- Stefan Sauk (born 1955), Swedish actor and comedian

== Places ==
- Sauk, Albania, a village
- Sauk County, Wisconsin, United States, named after the Sauk people
- Sauk Village, Illinois, United States
- Sauk Lake, in Cook County, Illinois, United States

== Other uses ==
- Sauk people, group of Native Americans of the Eastern Woodlands culture group
- South African Broadcasting Corporation (Afrikaans: Suid-Afrikaanse Uitsaaikorporasie)

== See also ==
- Sauk-Suiattle, group of Native Americans in western Washington state in the United States
- Sauk Centre, Minnesota
- Sauk River (disambiguation)
- Sauk sequence, in geology, a North American cratonic sequence
- Sauk Trail, an Indian trail across Illinois, Indiana and Michigan in the United States
