= Placitas, Lincoln County, New Mexico =

Historic village in New Mexico

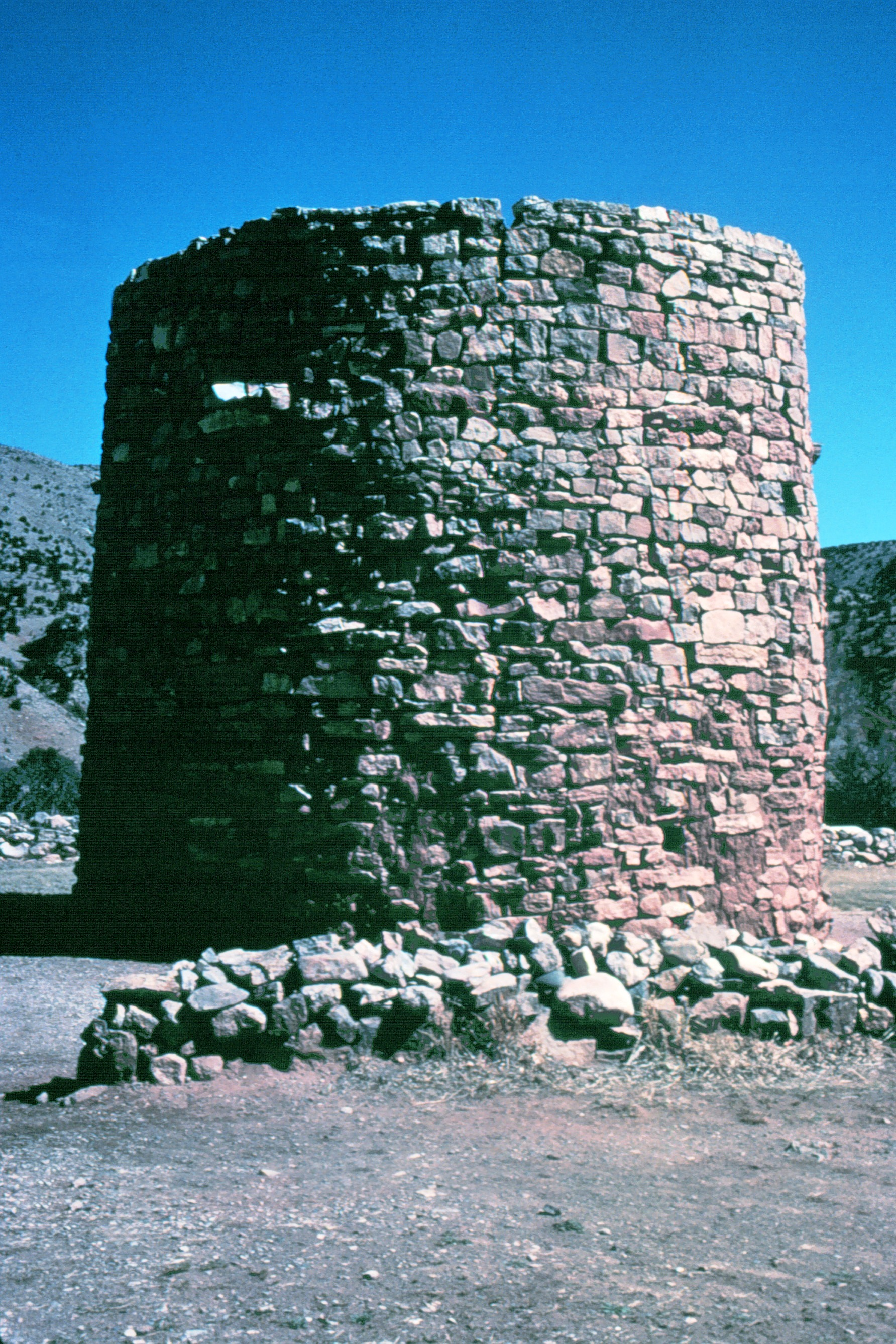
The Torréon, in Placitas, a rock fort tower where settlers hid during skirmishes with the local Indigenous people. It was built by the Miranda family and Enrico Trujillo.

Placitas, also known as La Placita and La Placita del Rio Bonito, was a settlement in Lincoln County, New Mexico The unincorporated hamlet is now named Lincoln.

The area was originally inhabited by local indigenous peoples, the Mogollon, later the Piros, followed by the Mescalero Apache. Arriving about 1852, the first settlers were Hispanics who arrived from Soccoro and Manzano. The Torréon tower was one of the first structures built in the village as a defensive fortification.

Fort Stanton, 9 miles (14 km) west, was established in 1855. By that date Placitas had a population of about 100.The village was the site of the 1861 Battle of Placito during the American Civil War along the frontier between New Mexico Territory and Confederate Arizona. The Apaches attacked the Hispanic settlement of Placitas. New Mexican residents aided by Confederate soldiers from Fort Stanton drove them away.

The village was first called La Placita del Rio Bonito (The Place by the Pretty River). Lincoln County was created in 1869 and Placitas was renamed Lincoln and designated as the county seat, a distinction it lost in 1909 to Carrizozo. The village has historical ties to Billy the Kid. Placitas is located at 33°29′31″N 105°23′02″W.
