= Kennekuk =

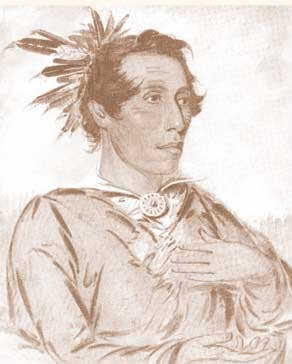
Kennekuk in about 1832.

Keannekeuk (c. 1790–1852), also known as the "Kickapoo Prophet", was a Kickapoo medicine man and spiritual leader of the Vermilion band of the Kickapoo nation. He lived in East Central Illinois much of his life along the Vermilion River. One source translates his name as "the drunkard's son." As a young man, he killed his uncle in a fit of drunken rage, and was ostracized by his tribe. He wandered between frontier settlements in Indiana and Illinois begging for food until a Catholic priest took him in to teach him Christianity. Kennekuk decided to renounce alcohol and began preaching to persuade others to do the same. His people welcomed him back, and by 1816 Kennekuk, then in his mid-twenties, had become a leading chief of the Vermilion band. Within a short time, alcohol use among his followers had declined significantly and his community became more cohesive and productive.

== Life ==
From 1833 until his death in 1852, he led a community of followers, whose beliefs centered on non-violence, passive resistance to resettlement, abstinence from alcohol, and meditation. He favored moderate, nonviolent accommodation and coexistence with American westward expansion, and a settled agricultural life. These views caused him and his followers to suffer derision and alienation from some of the other Kickapoo bands. His tribal community's religious outlook embodied a type of Christian evangelism in some respects and a group of Potawatomi converts joined his following over time. He died on the reservation in Kansas in 1852.

Reverend William H. Honnell, who visited a few years after Kennekuk's death, reported that Kennekuk went back and forth between Christian teachings and "heathenism."

Some Kickapoo descendants still follow the tenets of his preaching.
