= Territorial evolution of the Confederate States =

The Confederate States of America was created on February 8, 1861, by representatives from six states that had recently declared their secession from the United States of America, starting with South Carolina on December 20, 1860. After the start of the American Civil War on April 12, 1861, between the two countries, five additional states would secede, and representatives of two others would gain admittance to the Confederacy. The country also held alliances with several Indian nations and claimed a territory in its far west. However, after its swift formation, it would only lose control over its territory over the next four years, culminating in total defeat in early 1865 and the formal dissolution of the government on May 5. The entire claimed area of the Confederate States was claimed by the United States.

== Table of changes ==
Key to map colors
Confederate States states
Confederate States territories
seceded from United States but not part of Confederate States
area changed by event

| Date | Event | Change Map |
|---|---|---|
| December 20, 1860 | In response to the election of Abraham Lincoln as President of the United States, South Carolina proclaimed its secession from the Union, withdrawing from Congress. | Map of the change to the founding states of the Confederate States on December 20, 1860 |
| January 9, 1861 | Mississippi proclaimed its secession from the Union, withdrawing from Congress. | Map of the change to the founding states of the Confederate States on January 9, 1861 |
| January 10, 1861 | Florida proclaimed its secession from the Union, withdrawing from Congress. | Map of the change to the founding states of the Confederate States on January 10, 1861 |
| January 11, 1861 | Alabama proclaimed its secession from the Union, withdrawing from Congress. | Map of the change to the founding states of the Confederate States on January 11, 1861 |
| January 19, 1861 | Georgia proclaimed its secession from the Union, withdrawing from Congress. | Map of the change to the founding states of the Confederate States on January 19, 1861 |
| January 26, 1861 | Louisiana proclaimed its secession from the Union, withdrawing from Congress. | Map of the change to the founding states of the Confederate States on January 26, 1861 |
| February 8, 1861 | The Confederate States of America was formed by representatives of the seceded states of Alabama, Georgia, Florida, Louisiana, Mississippi, and South Carolina. The capital was established at Montgomery. | Map of the change to the Confederate States on February 8, 1861 |
| March 2, 1861 | Texas proclaimed its secession from the Union and was admitted to the Confederate States, withdrawing from Congress. | Map of the change to the Confederate States on March 2, 1861 |
| March 28, 1861 | Representatives in the southern half of New Mexico Territory proclaimed an independent Arizona Territory south of the 34th parallel north. | Map of the change to the Confederate States on March 28, 1861 |
| April 17, 1861 | Following the Battle of Fort Sumter on April 12, 1861, and President Abraham Lincoln's call for troops to respond, Virginia proclaimed its secession from the Union, withdrawing from Congress. | Map of the change to the Confederate States on April 17 1861 |
| May 6, 1861 | Arkansas proclaimed its secession from the Union, withdrawing from Congress. | Map of the change to the Confederate States on May 6, 1861 |
| May 7, 1861 | Virginia was admitted to the Confederate States. | Map of the change to the Confederate States on May 7, 1861 |
| May 20, 1861 | Arkansas was admitted to the Confederate States. North Carolina proclaimed its secession from the Union, withdrawing from Congress. | Map of the change to the Confederate States on May 20, 1861 |
| May 21, 1861 | North Carolina was admitted to the Confederate States. The law admitting the state required a presidential proclamation before it was to take effect, which sources say took place on this date; the only primary source found so far is a statement from Jefferson Davis on July 20 stating that the proclamation had been made. | Map of the change to the Confederate States on May 21, 1861 |
| June 8, 1861 | Tennessee proclaimed its secession from the Union, withdrawing from Congress. | Map of the change to the Confederate States on June 8, 1861 |
| July 2, 1861 | Tennessee was admitted to the Confederate States. | Map of the change to the Confederate States on July 2, 1861 |
| July 20, 1861 | The capital was moved to Richmond. | Map of the change to the Confederate States on July 20, 1861 |
| August 1, 1861 | Following Confederate victory in the First Battle of Mesilla, Arizona Territory was proclaimed as part of the Confederate States. | Map of the change to the Confederate States on August 1, 1861 |
| October 31, 1861 | A splinter government in Neosho, Missouri, declared the secession of the state from the United States. | Map of the change to the Confederate States on October 31, 1861 |
| November 20, 1861 | A convention in Russellville, Kentucky, declared the formation of a splinter government in Bowling Green and the secession of Kentucky from the United States. | Map of the change to the Confederate States on November 20, 1861 |
| November 28, 1861 | The splinter Neosho government of Missouri was admitted to the Confederate States. The Confederate States never held much power over the state, but it was given full representation in the legislature. | Map of the change to the Confederate States on November 28, 1861 |
| December 10, 1861 | The splinter Bowling Green government of Kentucky was admitted to the Confederate States. The Confederate States never held much power over the state, but it was given full representation in the legislature. | Map of the change to the Confederate States on December 10, 1861 |
| December 21, 1861 | The Confederate States ratified treaties with the Osage, and the Seneca and Shawnee. | Map of the change to the Confederate States on December 21, 1861 |
| December 23, 1861 | The Confederate States ratified treaties with the Cherokee, granting them a delegate to the Congress of the Confederate States, and with the Seminole, granting them a delegate to be shared with the Creek. | Map of the change to the Confederate States on December 23, 1861 |
| December 31, 1861 | The Confederate States ratified treaties with the Choctaw and Chickasaw, granting them a delegate in the Congress of the Confederate States; with the Comanche; with the Creek, granting them a delegate to be shared with the Seminole; and the Quapaw. | Map of the change to the Confederate States on December 31, 1861 |
| April 2, 1865 | After the fall of Richmond, the government fled for Danville. | Map of the change to the Confederate States on April 2, 1865 |
| April 11, 1865 | With Union forces threatening Danville, the government fled to Greensboro. | Map of the change to the Confederate States on April 11, 1865 |
| April 22, 1865 | The last meetings of the full cabinet began in Charlotte, and would last until April 26. | Map of the change to the Confederate States on April 22, 1865 |
| May 5, 1865 | The remaining members of the cabinet met in Washington, Georgia, and dissolved the country. Military surrenders were scattered throughout 1865, but the most important is regarded as that of the Army of Northern Virginia following the Battle of Appomattox Court House on April 9. | Map of the change to the Confederate States on May 5, 1865 |
