= Sauk River =

Sauk River may refer to:

- Sauk River (Michigan), a tributary of the Coldwater River in Branch County, Michigan, United States
- Sauk River (Minnesota), a tributary of the Mississippi River in Minnesota, United States
- Sauk River (Washington), a tributary of the Skagit River in Washington, United States
