= Gallinas massacre =

Gallinas Massacre
- Part of the American Civil War and the Apache Wars
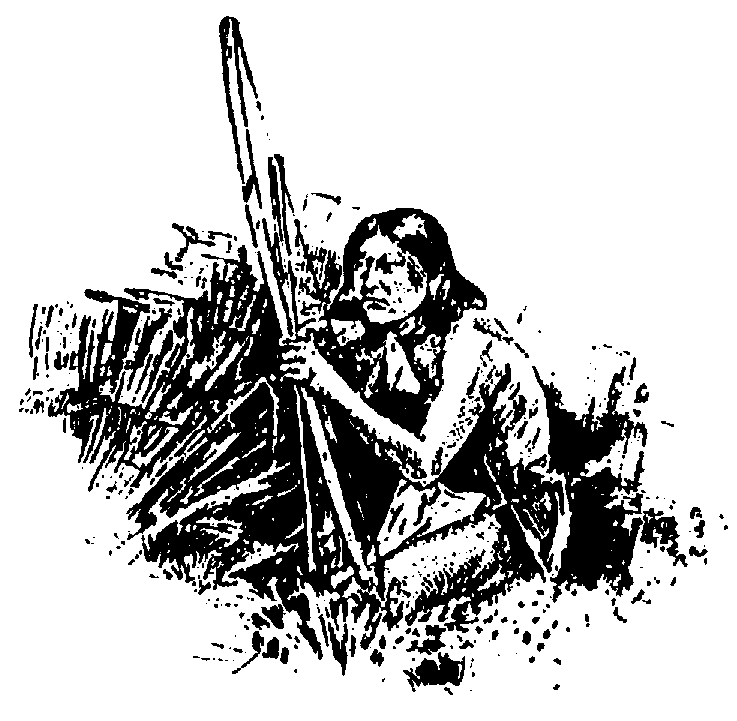
- An Apache warrior waiting for an ambush
| Date | September 2, 1861 |
| Location | Gallinas Mountains, Confederate Arizona (present-day Lincoln County, New Mexico) |
| Result | Apache victory |

Belligerents
| (Confederate States of America) Confederate States | Mescalero Apache |

Strength
| 4 cavalry | ~30 warriors |

Casualties and losses
| 3 killed | Unknown |

The Gallinas massacre or the Gallinas Mountains massacre was an engagement of the Apache Wars on September 2, 1861, between a war party of Mescalero Apache warriors and four Confederate soldiers in the Gallinas Mountains of what is now Lincoln County, New Mexico. The incident occurred early in the American Civil War, at a time when the area was claimed by the Confederate States of America as part of Confederate Arizona and military control of the territory had not yet been decisively established by either Union or Confederate forces.

== Massacre ==
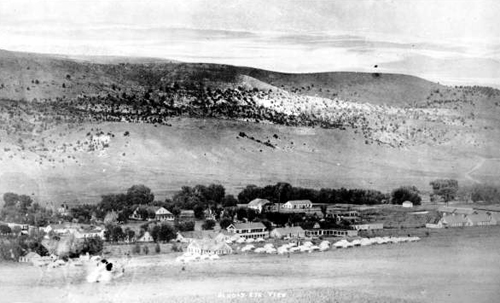
Fort Stanton

On September 1, 1861, at Fort Stanton, Confederate Lieutenant John Pulliam dispatched four of his men from the Army of New Mexico to the Gallinas Mountains, a day's ride away. Their objective was to watch for any approaching Union forces. Lieutenant Pulliam ordered the men to make camp a safe distance from the spring in the mountains. Not fearing attack, the four ignored this order and camped just 100 yards from the creek in a heavily wooded area. The four soldiers were T.G. Pemberton, Joseph V. Mosse, Joseph Emmanacker and Floyd A. Sanders. It is not known which of the four was in command.

The next morning, at breakfast time, three Apaches were seen running through the surrounding pine trees. Immediately breakfast was stopped, and the men saddled their horses. At this time, a shower of arrows rained down upon the Confederates from about 30 Apaches who had surrounded the camp. The four dismounted and took cover behind the pines and then attempted to shoot their muskets. To much surprise, all four of the weapons failed to fire. This suggests that either the Apaches had tampered with the muskets during the night or mountain dew had dampened their gunpowder.

The Confederates then drew their revolvers, and a skirmish began that lasted for almost two hours. By that time, Mosse, Emmanacker and Pemberton were dead. Sanders, left to fight alone, mounted Mosse's horse and escaped by riding down a steep mountain slope. The Apaches pursued him in a running fight which went on for ten miles. This account was what Sanders reported to Lieutenant Pulliam upon arriving back at Fort Stanton. Apache casualties are unknown.

Within the next couple of days, a Confederate force of 15 men proceeded to the Gallinas Mountains; there they recovered the remains of Mosse and Emmanacker. Pemberton's body was never found. The Confederates returned to Fort Stanton on September 8; that same evening, Lieutenant Pulliam was dispatched with 15 men to Placitas to fight the Apaches there.

== See also ==
- List of massacres in New Mexico
- New Mexico campaign
