= Santa Rosa de Múzquiz =

City in the Mexican state of Coahuila

Melchor Múzquiz (Ciudad Melchor Múzquiz)
- Municipal seat and city
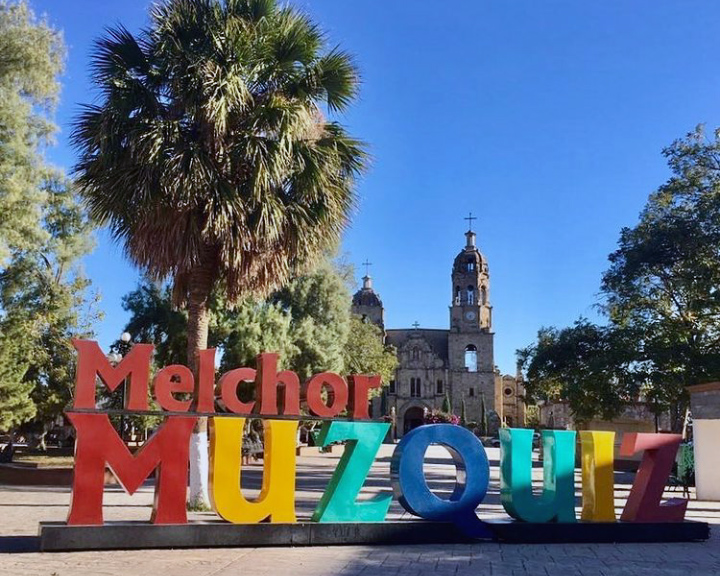

- Location in Mexico Melchor Múzquiz (Coahuila)
- Coordinates: 27°52′N 101°30′W
- Country: Mexico
- State: Coahuila
- Municipality: Múzquiz

Population (2020)
  - Total: 38,992
- Website: https://muzquiz.mx

Melchor Múzquiz (also: Ciudad Melchor Múzquiz, Ciudad Múzquiz, or simply Múzquiz) is a city and seat of the municipality of Múzquiz, in the north-eastern Mexican state of Coahuila.

The city is named for Melchor Múzquiz, President of the Republic in 1832, born in Santa Rosa in 1790.

== History ==
The city was founded on 26 September 1735 by the viceroy Juan Antonio de Vizarrón y Eguiarreta as a Spanish garrison in order to protect them from the constant native attacks. The name of the settlement was firstly called Santa Rosa María del Sacramento, name that was approved by the viceroy on 29 August 1737. On 6 February 1850, the settlement's name was abolished and it was renamed to Villa de Múzquiz, honoring the interim President Melchor Múzquiz. On March 9 1925, Villa de Múzquiz was declared a city and its name changed to the current Melchor Múzquiz. Her "ciudades amigas" was established with Denton, Texas in 2015. Múzquiz was declared part of the "Pueblos Mágicos" touristic program in 2018.
