= Powhattan, Kansas =

City in Brown County, Kansas

- City
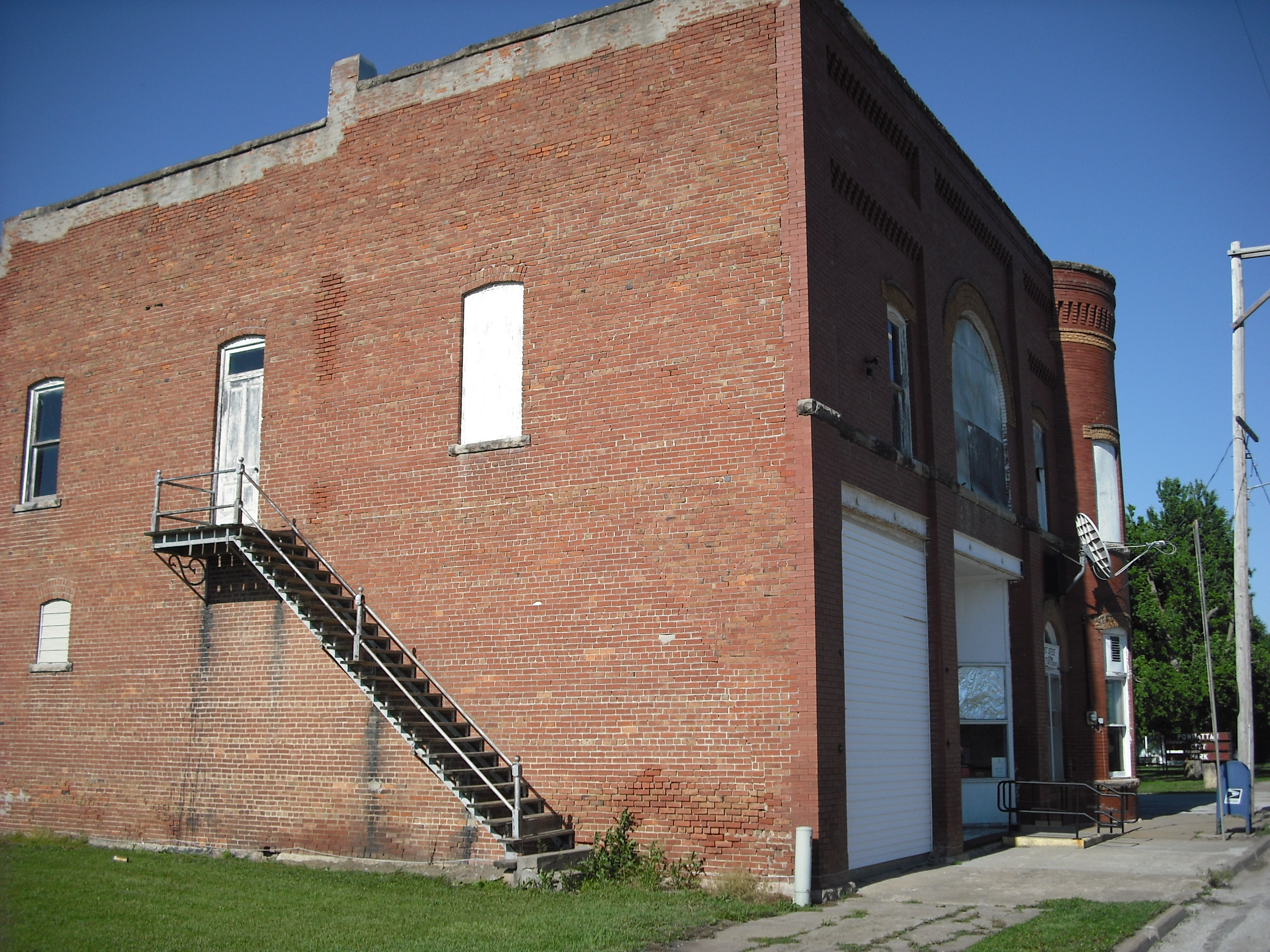
- Powhattan Post Office (2009)

- Location within Brown County and Kansas

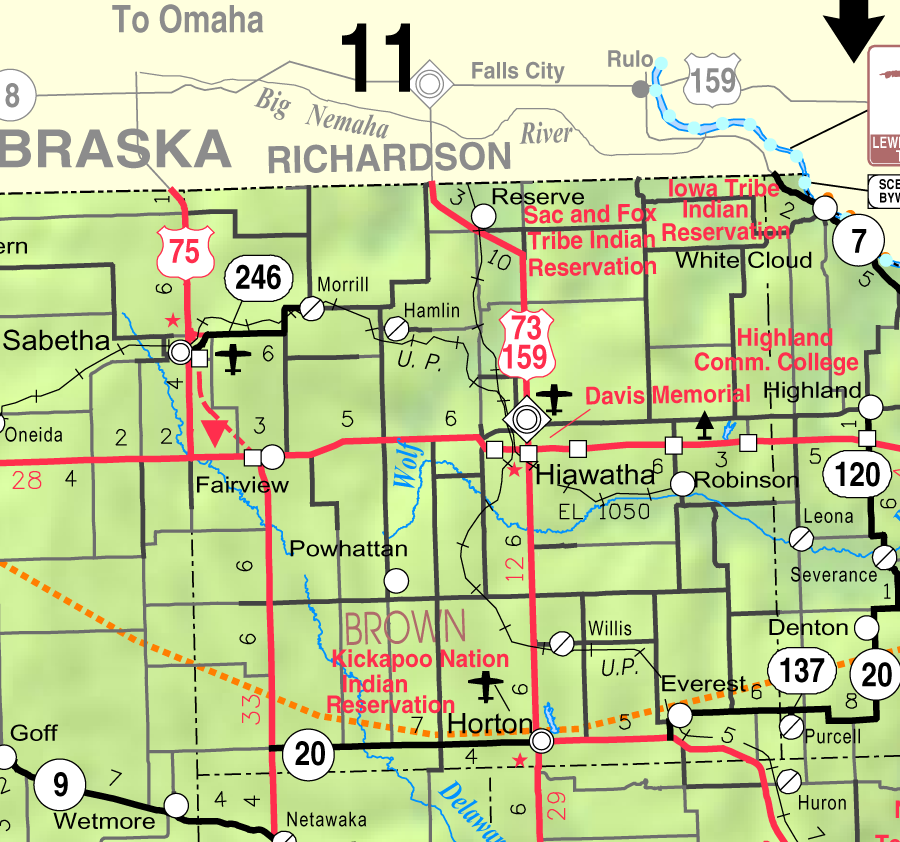
- KDOT map of Brown County (legend)
- Coordinates: 39°45′42″N 95°38′02″W
- Country: United States
- State: Kansas
- County: Brown
- Founded: 1877
- Incorporated: 1887
- Named for: Powhatan

Area
  - Total: 0.14 sq mi (0.35 km^{2})
  - Land: 0.14 sq mi (0.35 km^{2})
  - Water: 0 sq mi (0.00 km^{2})
- Elevation: 1,211 ft (369 m)

Population (2020)
  - Total: 69
  - Density: 510/sq mi (200/km^{2})
- Time zone: UTC-6 (CST)
  - Summer (DST): UTC-5 (CDT)
- ZIP Code: 66527
- Area code: 785
- FIPS code: 20-57350
- GNIS ID: 2396265

Powhattan is a city in Brown County, Kansas, United States. As of the 2020 census, the population of the city was 69.

== History ==
Powhattan was founded circa 1877. The city was named for the father of Pocahontas, who resided in Jamestown, Virginia. It was originally a stagecoach station named Locknane.

== Geography ==
According to the United States Census Bureau, the city has a total area of 0.14 square miles (0.36 km^{2}), all land.

== Demographics ==
Historical population
Census	Pop.	Note	%±
1900	237		—
1910	216		−8.9%
1920	247		14.4%
1930	221		−10.5%
1940	184		−16.7%
1950	150		−18.5%
1960	128		−14.7%
1970	111		−13.3%
1980	95		−14.4%
1990	111		16.8%
2000	91		−18.0%
2010	77		−15.4%
2020	69		−10.4%
U.S. Decennial Census

=== 2020 census ===
The 2020 United States census counted 69 people, 26 households, and 14 families in Powhattan. The population density was 503.6 per square mile (194.5/km^{2}). There were 39 housing units at an average density of 284.7 per square mile (109.9/km^{2}). The racial makeup was 68.12% (47) white or European American (68.12% non-Hispanic white), 2.9% (2) black or African-American, 10.14% (7) Native American or Alaska Native, 0.0% (0) Asian, 0.0% (0) Pacific Islander or Native Hawaiian, 4.35% (3) from other races, and 14.49% (10) from two or more races. Hispanic or Latino of any race was 2.9% (2) of the population.

Of the 26 households, 34.6% had children under the age of 18; 38.5% were married couples living together; 34.6% had a female householder with no spouse or partner present. 38.5% of households consisted of individuals and 19.2% had someone living alone who was 65 years of age or older. The average household size was 2.3 and the average family size was 3.4. The percent of those with a bachelor's degree or higher was estimated to be 7.2% of the population.

31.9% of the population was under the age of 18, 4.3% from 18 to 24, 15.9% from 25 to 44, 18.8% from 45 to 64, and 29.0% who were 65 years of age or older. The median age was 42.5 years. For every 100 females, there were 137.9 males. For every 100 females ages 18 and older, there were 135.0 males.

The 2016–2020 5-year American Community Survey estimates show that the median household income was $36,250 (with a margin of error of +/- $13,249) and the median family income was $38,333 (+/- $8,879). Males had a median income of $23,750 (+/- $23,276) versus $28,438 (+/- $16,188) for females. The median income for those above 16 years old was $27,500 (+/- $13,090). Approximately, 27.8% of families and 25.8% of the population were below the poverty line, including 55.2% of those under the age of 18 and 0.0% of those ages 65 or over.

=== 2010 census ===
At the 2010 census there were 77 people in 30 households, including 20 families, in the city. The population density was 550.0 inhabitants per square mile (212.4/km^{2}). There were 38 housing units at an average density of 271.4 per square mile (104.8/km^{2}). The racial makup of the city was 90.9% White and 9.1% Native American. Hispanic or Latino of any race were 2.6%.

Of the 30 households 33.3% had children under the age of 18 living with them, 63.3% were married couples living together, 3.3% had a female householder with no husband present, and 33.3% were non-families. 33.3% of households were one person and 23.3% were one person aged 65 or older. The average household size was 2.57 and the average family size was 3.30.

The median age was 34.8 years. 32.5% of residents were under the age of 18; 0.0% were between the ages of 18 and 24; 28.6% were from 25 to 44; 18.2% were from 45 to 64; and 20.8% were 65 or older. The gender makeup of the city was 40.3% male and 59.7% female.

=== 2000 census ===
At the 2000 census there were 91 people in 41 households, including 25 families, in the city. The population density was 686.2 inhabitants per square mile (264.9/km^{2}). There were 44 housing units at an average density of 331.8 per square mile (128.1/km^{2}). The racial makup of the city was 90.11% White, 7.69% Native American, and 2.20% from two or more races. Hispanic or Latino of any race were 3.30%.

Of the 41 households 26.8% had children under the age of 18 living with them, 51.2% were married couples living together, 4.9% had a female householder with no husband present, and 39.0% were non-families. 36.6% of households were one person and 29.3% were one person aged 65 or older. The average household size was 2.22 and the average family size was 2.88.

The age distribution was 22.0% under the age of 18, 12.1% from 18 to 24, 18.7% from 25 to 44, 22.0% from 45 to 64, and 25.3% 65 or older. The median age was 42 years. For every 100 females, there were 82.0 males. For every 100 females age 18 and over, there were 86.8 males.

The median household income was $21,500 and the median family income was $29,167. Males had a median income of $28,542 versus $16,250 for females. The per capita income for the city was $12,147. There were no families and 12.1% of the population living below the poverty line, including no under eighteens and none of those over 64.

== Education ==
The community is served by South Brown County USD 430 public school district.

There is a tribal Bureau of Indian Education (BIE)-affiliated school, Kickapoo Nation School.
