= Battle of Dove Creek =

1865 battle of the American Civil War

Coordinates: 31.1912°N 100.7189°W

- Part of the Trans-Mississippi Theater of the American Civil War, Texas–Indian Wars
Date	January 8, 1865
Location	Knickerbocker, Tom Green County, Texas
Result	Kickapoo Indians victory

Belligerents
Kickapoo Indians	Confederate States

Commanders and leaders
No-ko-aht	(Confederate States of America) Henry Fossett (Confederate States of America) S.S. Totten

Strength
400–600	Frontier Battalion (161); Texas Militia (325)

Casualties and losses
Totten claims 100 killed, Kickapoo and Fossett claim between ~12–23 (probably more accurate)	22 killed 19 wounded

The Battle of Dove Creek was a small engagement during the American Civil War that took place January 8, 1865, along Dove Creek in what is now southwest Tom Green County, Texas. Texan soldiers under Confederate captains Henry Fossett and S.S. Totten, misunderstanding which tribe occupied a discovered camp, attacked a tribe of peaceful Kickapoo Indians and were badly beaten by an organized defense.

== Background ==
In mid-December 1864, Captain N.M. Gillentine and two dozen Texas militiamen discovered an abandoned Indian camp of 92 shelter sites along the Clear Fork of the Brazos River, and, suspecting the site to be evidence of hostile Comanche or Kiowa Indians, called for militia to locate and address the threat. On January 1, 1865, Texas Frontier Battalion troops under the command of Captain Henry Fossett arrived at Fort Chadbourne to await the militia concentration. After two days, Fossett led his two companies in search of the trail and located the natives along the Dove Creek, encamped in timberland.

== Battle ==
Just as Fossett prepared his morning assault, the exhausted militia troops arrived after hard forced march, and the two captains chose to cooperate in a joint attack. Totten agreed that the militia would form a line of battle and approach the camp in a frontal assault astride the creek from the north while better equipped Confederates under Fossett would maneuver around to the southwest, capture the Indians' grazing horse herd, and attack from the flank.

Kickapoo Indians inside the camp had been peaceful since the days of the Black Hawk War. In fact, they were migrating to Mexico to avoid the turmoil of the Civil War, but they were not unprepared for violence. The Kickapoo benefited from the well-placed camp, located on a tall bank covered with light timber and protected by natural brier thickets common to the Cross Timbers area. The first militia attacks suffered from brier hazards while under intense Indian rifle fire. According to a witness, three Texan officers (including Gillentine) and sixteen enlisted men were killed in the first few minutes.

Fossett's flank attack initially succeeded in capturing the herd, but assault by a Confederate detachment under Lieutenant J.A. Brooks broke down after native gunfire killed a dozen horses. Gradually, the isolated Confederate columns found themselves in crossfire with the Indians closing in. After a brief rout, militia reformed along the Spring Creek to the north, and Kickapoo pursuers inflicted additional casualties on the Confederates escaping to the camp.

== See also ==
- List of wars involving the Confederate States of America
