= Múzquiz Municipality =

Municipality in the Mexican state of Coahuila

Múzquiz, Coahuila Municipio de Múzquiz
- Municipality
- Municipality of Múzquiz
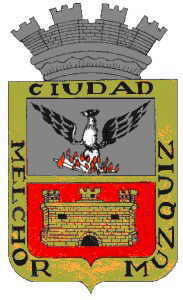
- Coat of arms

- Municipality of Múzquiz in Coahuila
- Coordinates: 27°52′43″N 101°31′2″W
- Country: Mexico
- State: Coahuila
- Municipal seat: Santa Rosa de Múzquiz

Area
  - Total: 8,128.9 km^{2} (3,138.6 sq mi)

Population (2005)
  - Total: 62,710
- Website: https://muzquiz.mx

Múzquiz is one of the 38 municipalities of Coahuila, in north-eastern Mexico. The municipal seat lies at Santa Rosa de Múzquiz. The municipality covers an area of 8,128.9 square kilometres (3,138.6 sq mi).

As of 2005, the municipality had a total population of 62,710. Of these, 242 spoke an indigenous language, primarily Kickapoo and Nahuatl.

It is named for Melchor Múzquiz, President of the Republic in 1832, born in Santa Rosa in 1790.

Besides the seat, other towns of note include the coal mining town of Palaú (pop 16,000).

== Communities originating in the United States ==
The town of El Nacimiento is home to the Kickapoo and the Mascogos, both of whom originated in the eastern United States. The Mascogos (Spanish: Negros Mascogos) are descendants of Black Seminoles who had fled to Indian Territory following the Seminole Wars. Both the Kickapoo and the Mascogos later left Indian Territory and settled in Mexico. Locals in El Nacimiento celebrate Juneteenth, known locally as "Day of the Blacks" (Spanish: Día de los Negros).

== 2021 mining accident ==
A mine in Las Rancherías collapsed on June 4, 2021, killing seven. The miners who died were identified as: Mauricio Cortés (from La Cuchilla), Humberto Rodríguez (from La Mota), Damián Ernesto Robles Arias, 27 (from Las Rancherías), Gonzalo Cruz Marín, 53 (from Las Rancherías), Leopoldo Méndez Sánchez, 20 (from La Mota), and Francisco Briseño (“Chicano”). The collapse was due to recent heavy rains. 43 safety violations were detected during the last inspection in July 2004, and 48 urgent recommendations were made; however, there was no follow-up.

The organization Pasta de Conchos complained of the dangerous conditions in the mine in September 2020, but nothing was done to improve the situation. The complaints included a lack of drinking water, the lack of safety equipment (gas meter, first-aid kit, fire extinguishers), poor ventilation, a lack of self-rescue equipment, and a lack of clarity if the workers were registered to receive benefits from the Mexican Social Security Institute (IMSS).

The bodies of the seven miners were removed on June 10. 66 soldiers and 21 members of the National Guard participated in the rescue. The rescue effort took 150 hours of work.

== See also ==
- Pasta de Conchos mine disaster
