= Battle of Placito =

1861 battle in the American Civil War

- Part of the American Civil War, Apache Wars
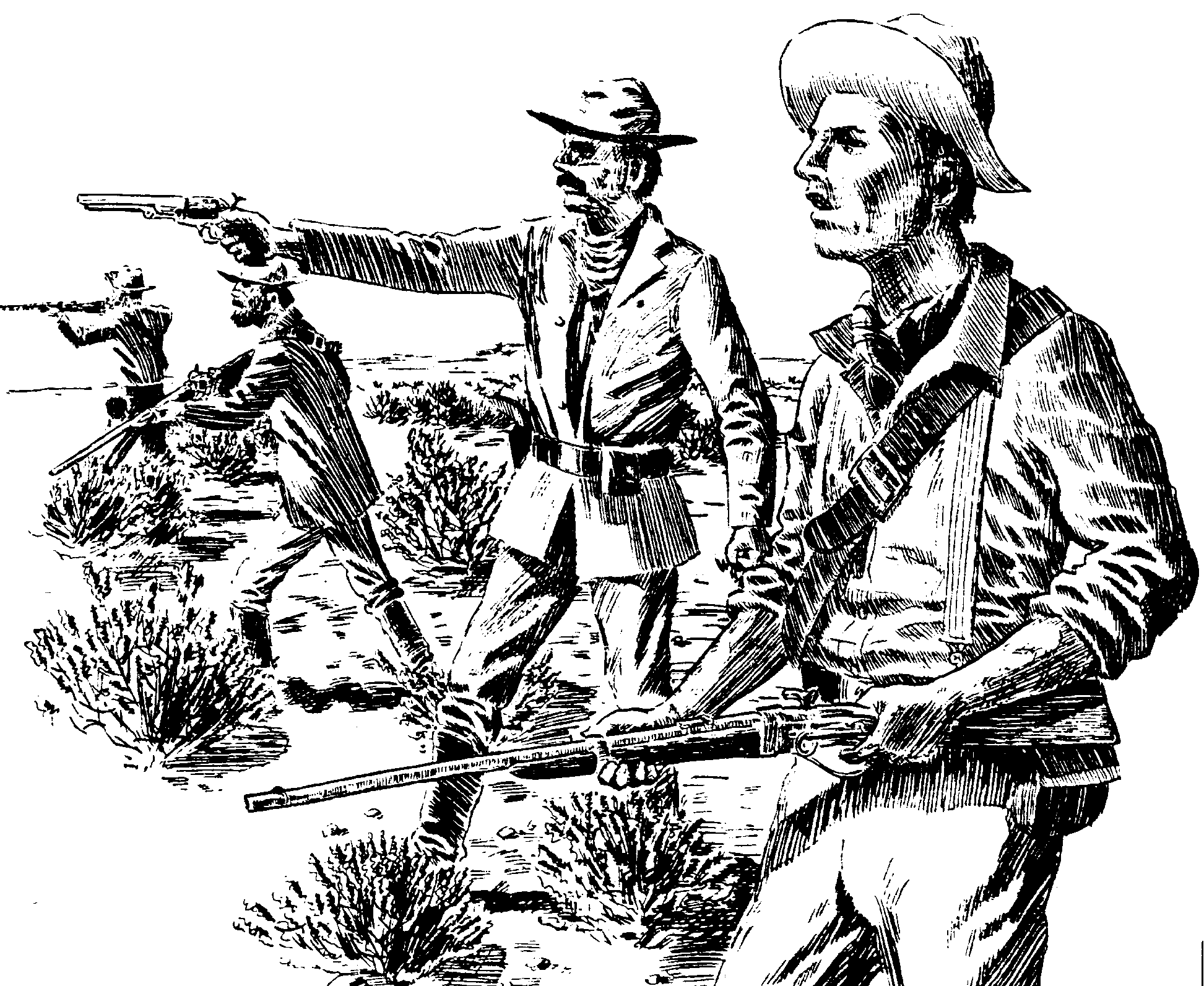
- Arizona militia during the Civil War.
Date	September 8, 1861
Location	Placitas, New Mexico Territory (USA), Arizona Territory (CSA); now in Lincoln County, New Mexico
Result	Confederate victory

Belligerents
Confederate States	Apache

Commanders and leaders
(Confederate States of America) John Pulliam	Unknown

Strength
~20	Unknown

Casualties and losses
Unknown	Claim of 5 killed

The Battle of Placito or Battle of the Placito. September 8, 1861, was an engagement between ethnic Hispanic settlers, Confederate soldiers, and Apache warriors. It took place at the village of Placitas (present-day Lincoln) in Confederate Arizona. The action is a part of the Apache Wars of the mid to late nineteenth century.

== Background ==
Following the Gallinas massacre, Lieutenant John Pulliam of the Confederate garrison at Fort Stanton returned from his patrol in the Gallinas Mountains where he had searched for three dead soldiers, massacred a week earlier. He arrived at Fort Stanton on September 8, 1861. That same evening, a dispatch arrived from Placitas, a settlement occupied by Hispanic settlers. The dispatch asked help from the Fort to fend off a Apache attack on the town, 9 miles (14 km) east of the fort. Pulliam was ordered to proceed to the village with fifteen soldiers to help protect its citizens.

== Battle ==
Pulliam and his 15 men arrived at Placitas that night. The Confederates and an unknown number of Hispanic men drove the Apaches out of town and then fought the Apaches all night at long range. Eventually, the Apache gave up the attack and withdrew back into the surrounding countryside. Casualties are unknown. Pulliam claimed to have killed at least five Apaches Pulliam and his men arrived back at Fort Stanton the following afternoon. Fort Stanton was abandoned by the Confederates on September 10 as the commander decided he didn't have the resources to contest the Apaches.

== See also ==
- New Mexico campaign
